= Degrees of the University of Oxford =

The system of academic degrees at the University of Oxford originates in the Middle Ages and has evolved since the university's founding at an uncertain date, probably in the 11th century.

Almost all undergraduate courses at Oxford lead to the degree of Bachelor of Arts (BA), the exceptions being the degrees of Bachelor of Theology (BTh) and Bachelor of Fine Arts (BFA). The university also has two postgraduate bachelor degrees – its Bachelor of Civil Law is equivalent to a Master of Laws elsewhere, and its Bachelor of Philosophy is equivalent to a Master of Philosophy. In the past, other postgraduate courses led to bachelor's degrees, as with Bachelor of Divinity, but in most cases these degrees have since been renamed to master's degrees.

Seven years after matriculation, Bachelors of Arts and of Fine Arts may apply to be promoted to Masters of Arts, by seniority, but this is an academic rank at the university and not a postgraduate degree. Integrated master's programmes, comprising four years of undergraduate study, lead to a single degree, such as that of Master of Mathematics (MMath). The university offers a number of postgraduate master's degrees – chiefly those of Master of Philosophy, Master of Science, and Master of Studies. The professional degrees of Master of Business Administration, Master of Fine Arts, Master of Public Policy, and Master of Theology are also awarded at Oxford.

The Doctor of Philosophy degree at the University is abbreviated to "DPhil" rather than "PhD".

Oxford also awards the degrees of Doctor of Clinical Psychology (DClinPsych) and Doctor of Medicine (DM), in addition to higher doctorates such as that of Doctor of Civil Law.

In postnominals, "University of Oxford" is normally abbreviated "Oxon.", which is short for Oxoniensis, or "Oxf.".

== Undergraduate awards ==
- Bachelor of Arts (BA)
- Bachelor of Fine Art (BFA)

For the bachelor's degrees, there are examinations (called Final Schools) in the student's final Trinity term, which usually comes in the third or fourth year after matriculation, and the degrees are awarded at a graduation ceremony soon afterwards. Contrary to common UK practice, 'The University does not award BA (Hons) qualifications, but considers candidates awarded a BA to have achieved honours status if they have been classified with a third class degree or higher'.

Until the 20th century, all undergraduates studied for the degree of Bachelor of Arts. The BFA was introduced in 1978. Holders of the degrees of BA and BFA may both proceed in time to the degree of Master of Arts (MA). The BA is awarded even for science courses, such as the three-year Physics degree. The degree of Bachelor of Science (BSc) has never been awarded as an undergraduate degree at Oxford. It used to be awarded as a graduate qualification, however.

- Bachelor of Theology (BTh)

The BTh is awarded primarily to students of the various theological colleges and halls, such as Wycliffe Hall, Regent's Park College, Blackfriars, St Stephen's House, Ripon College Cuddesdon, Harris Manchester College and the former Westminster College, Oxford. Usually, these students are candidates for the ordained ministry of one of the mainstream Christian denominations, but may be drawn from any faith background (Unitarian ordinands study at HMC) or none at the discretion of the College or Hall. The degree should not be confused with that of bachelor of divinity (BD), which is a postgraduate degree.

- Bachelor of Education (BEd)

The BEd was formerly awarded to students residing at Westminster College, Culham College of Education, the Lady Spencer Churchill College of Education, and Milton Keynes College of Education (formerly the North Buckinghamshire College of Education), which are not colleges of the University of Oxford, if they read concurrently at the university.

- Undergraduate Advanced Diploma (UGAdvDip)

The UGAdvDip is a FHEQ Level 6 award, which is equivalent to the third year of undergraduate study and it is generally accepted as equivalent to a second bachelor's degree or a Graduate Diploma. Undergraduate Advanced Diplomas are offered at the University of Cambridge and the University of Oxford only.

=== Undergraduate master's degrees ===
Beginning in the 1990s, the following degrees were introduced to increase public recognition of the four-year undergraduate science programmes in these subjects:

- Master of Biochemistry (MBiochem)
- Master of Biology (MBiol)
- Master of Biomedical Sciences (MBiomedSci)
- Master of Chemistry (MChem)
- Master of Computer Science (MCompSci)
- Master of Computer Science and Philosophy (MCompSciPhil), first entry 2012
- Master of Earth Sciences (MEarthSci)
- Master of Engineering (MEng), awarded for degrees in both Engineering Science and Materials Science
- Master of Mathematics (MMath)
- Master of Mathematics and Computer Science (MMathCompSci)
- Master of Mathematics and Philosophy (MMathPhil)
- Master of Mathematics and Physics (MMathPhys)
- Master of Physics (MPhys)
- Master of Physics and Philosophy (MPhysPhil)

The holders of these degrees have the academic precedence and standing of BAs until the twenty-first term from matriculation, when they rank as MAs. From 2014 graduates with these degrees wear the same academic gown as a Master of Studies, with a black silk hood lined with sand fabric. Previously the academic dress was simply the BA gown and hood.

In contrast, science undergraduates at Cambridge may be granted the degree of Master of Natural Sciences (MSci) in addition to the BA (and the subsequent MA).

== Degree of Master of Arts ==
The degree of Master of Arts is awarded to BAs and BFAs seven years after matriculation, without further examination, upon the payment of a nominal fee. Recipients of undergraduate master's degrees are not eligible to incept as MA, but are afforded the same privileges after the statutory twenty-one terms. This system dates from the Middle Ages, when the study of the liberal arts took seven years.

== Postgraduate degrees ==
=== Bachelor's degrees ===
- Bachelor of Medicine & Bachelor of Surgery (BM, BCh)

At Oxford, the BM BCh degree is awarded after the completion of only another bachelor's degree. Undergraduate medicine students will receive a Bachelor of Arts in Medical Sciences degree at the end of the third year of the six-year programme. Graduates with an existing bachelor's degree may apply to a four-year version of the medicine course, which confers only the BM BCh.

- Bachelor of Divinity (BD)
- Bachelor of Letters (BLitt)
- Bachelor of Science (BSc)
- Bachelor of Music (BMus)

In medieval times a student could not study some subjects until study in the liberal arts was completed. These subjects were known as the higher faculties. The Bachelor of Science and Bachelor of Letters were added in the 19th century, and the Bachelor of Philosophy was added in 1914. The higher bachelor's degree programme is generally a taught programme of one or two years for graduates.

- Bachelor of Civil Law (BCL)
- Bachelor of Philosophy (BPhil) (now awarded in Philosophy only)

The only two remaining postgraduate-level courses awarded by the university are the Bachelor of Civil Law and the Bachelor of Philosophy, which are equivalent to master's degrees in law and philosophy, respectively.

=== Master's degrees ===
- Master of Philosophy (MPhil)
- Master of Letters (MLitt)
- Master of Science (MSc) (awarded by examination or by research)

The BLitt, BSc, and BPhil (in degrees other than philosophy) were re-titled master's degrees.

- Magister Juris (MJur)
- Master of Studies (MSt)
- Master of Theology (MTh)
- Master of Business Administration (MBA)
- Master of Fine Arts (MFA)
- Master of Public Policy (MPP)

The MJur and MBA are awarded after taught courses, the MJur being the equivalent of the BCL for students from non-common-law backgrounds. The MSt is a one-year hybrid research/taught course, which is the equivalent of the taught master's degree in most other UK universities. The MTh is an applied theology course for those intending to enter holy orders.

- Master of Education (MEd)

The degree of Master of Education was formerly awarded to students at Westminster College, when that course was validated by the university.

=== Diplomas ===
Historically at Oxford and Cambridge, a Diploma was a postgraduate qualification – for instance, the Cambridge Diploma in Computer Science. The title of Diploma has nonetheless mostly been replaced by the more common master's degree.

To distinguish postgraduate diplomas from graduate or undergraduate diplomas at other institutions, Oxford uses the term "postgraduate diploma". The Centre of Continuing Education offers part time diplomas in a number of specialised areas, and other faculties also offer postgraduate diploma courses such as the "Postgraduate Diploma in Intellectual Property Law and Practice" offered by the law faculty.

=== Doctorates ===
- Doctor of Divinity (DD)
- Doctor of Civil Law (DCL)
- Doctor of Medicine (DM)
- Doctor of Letters (DLitt)
- Doctor of Science (DSc)
- Doctor of Music (DMus)

Graduates in subjects other than Medicine can proceed to a doctorate without further examination on presentation of evidence of an important contribution to their subject, such as a series of influential published works.

Higher doctorates may also be awarded honoris causa, or as honorary degrees. It is traditional for the chancellor to be made a DCL jure officio (by virtue of his office). Until the 19th century all bishops who had studied at Oxford were made DDs jure officio.

- Doctor of Philosophy (DPhil)

The DPhil is a research degree, modelled on the German and American PhD, that was introduced in 1914. Oxford was the first university in the UK to accept this innovation.

- Doctor of Clinical Psychology (DClinPsychol)

The degree of DClinPsychol is the only professional doctorate at Oxford.

== Order of academic standing ==
Members of the University of Oxford are ranked according to their degree. The order is as follows:

- Doctor of Divinity
- Doctor of Civil Law
- Doctor of Medicine if also a Master of Arts
- Doctor of Letters if also a Master of Arts
- Doctor of Science if also a Master of Arts
- Doctor of Music if also a Master of Arts
- Doctor of Philosophy if also a Master of Arts
- Doctor of Clinical Psychology if also a Master of Arts
- Doctor of Engineering if also a Master of Arts
- Master of Surgery if also a Master of Arts
- Master of Science if also a Master of Arts
- Master of Letters if also a Master of Arts
- Master of Philosophy if also a Master of Arts
- Master of Studies if also a Master of Arts
- Master of Theology if also a Master of Arts
- Master of Education if also a Master of Arts
- Master of Business Administration if also a Master of Arts
- Master of Fine Art if also a Master of Arts
- Master of Public Policy if also a Master of Arts
- Master of Arts, or Master of Biochemistry or Chemistry or Computer Science or Earth Sciences or Engineering or Mathematics or Mathematics and Computer Science or Mathematics and Philosophy or Physics or Physics and Philosophy with effect from the twenty-first term from matriculation
- Doctor of Medicine if not also a Master of Arts
- Doctor of Letters if not also a Master of Arts
- Doctor of Science if not also a Master of Arts
- Doctor of Music if not also a Master of Arts
- Doctor of Philosophy if not also a Master of Arts
- Doctor of Clinical Psychology if not also a Master of Arts
- Doctor of Engineering if not also a Master of Arts
- Master of Surgery if not also a Master of Arts
- Master of Science if not also a Master of Arts
- Master of Letters if not also a Master of Arts
- Master of Philosophy if not also a Master of Arts
- Master of Studies if not also a Master of Arts
- Master of Theology if not also a Master of Arts
- Master of Education if not also a Master of Arts
- Master of Business Administration if not also a Master of Arts
- Master of Fine Art if not also a Master of Arts
- Master of Public Policy if not also a Master of Arts
- Bachelor of Divinity
- Bachelor of Civil Law
- Magister Juris
- Bachelor of Medicine
- Bachelor of Surgery
- Bachelor of Letters
- Bachelor of Science
- Bachelor of Music
- Bachelor of Philosophy
- Bachelor of Arts, or Master of Biochemistry or Chemistry or Computer Science or Earth Sciences or Engineering or Mathematics or Mathematics and Computer Science or Mathematics and Philosophy or Physics or Physics and Philosophy until the twenty-first term from matriculation
- Bachelor of Fine Art
- Bachelor of Theology
- Bachelor of Education

Within each degree the holders are ranked by the date on which they proceeded to their degree. In the case of people who graduated on the same day they are ranked by alphabetical order.

If the Degree of Master of Biochemistry, or Chemistry, or Computer Science, or Earth Sciences, or Engineering, or Mathematics, or Mathematics and Computer Science, or Mathematics and Philosophy, or Physics, or Physics and Philosophy, is held together with a higher degree, the holder will rank in precedence equally with a person who holds the same higher degree together with the Degree of Master of Arts.

== See also ==
- Academic degree
- Bachelor's degree
- Master's degree
- Doctorate
- University of Oxford
- Academic dress of the University of Oxford
