= British degree abbreviations =

Degree abbreviations in the United Kingdom

Degree abbreviations are used as an alternative way to specify an academic degree instead of spelling out the title in full, such as in reference books such as Who's Who and on business cards. Many degree titles have more than one possible abbreviation, with the abbreviation used varying between different universities. In the UK it is normal not to punctuate abbreviations for degrees with full stops (e.g. "BSc" rather than "B.Sc."), although this is done at some universities.

== Overview ==
The Frameworks for Higher Education Qualifications of UK Degree-Awarding Bodies lays down five levels of qualification with the title of degree: foundation (not in Scotland), ordinary and honours bachelor's (only separate levels in Scotland), master's and doctoral. These relate to specific outcome-based level descriptors and are tied to the Bologna Process.

It is common to put the name of the awarding institute in brackets after the degree abbreviation, e.g. BA (Lond). A list of standard abbreviations for British universities can be found at Universities in the United Kingdom § Post-nominal abbreviations.

Note that the lists below include historical degrees that may not currently be offered in British universities.

=== Anomalies ===
For historical reasons some universities (the ancient universities of England and Scotland) do not fully adhere to the Framework (particularly with respect to the title of Master of Arts), and degrees in medicine, dentistry, and veterinary medicine are titled as bachelor's degrees despite being at master's level.

==== Undergraduate Master of Arts degrees ====
The usage in the ancient universities is not consistent with the Framework or the Bologna Process. The ancient universities of England (Oxford and Cambridge) grant an MA degree that is not a substantive qualification but reflects the ancient practice of these universities of promoting BAs to MAs (and thus full membership of the University) a few years after graduating (see Master of Arts (Oxbridge and Dublin)). The ancient universities of Scotland award an undergraduate MA (see Scottish MA) instead of a BA. For students to obtain a master's degree consistent with the framework in these ancient English universities, they have created the MSt (Master of Studies) to address this anomaly and differentiate between the degrees, both master's.

The MAs from Aberdeen, Heriot-Watt, Glasgow, Edinburgh and St Andrews are considered bachelor's level qualifications on the Framework for Higher Education Qualifications and first cycle qualifications under the Bologna Process, while the Oxbridge MAs are considered "not academic qualifications" (the actual qualification being the BA).

==== Master's level bachelor's degrees ====
Conversely, some bachelor's degrees in the "higher faculties" at the older universities in the UK (e.g. those other than arts at Oxford and Cambridge) are postgraduate qualifications (e.g. the BCL and BMus at Oxford). Many have been changed to the corresponding master's degree (e.g. BSc is now MSc at Oxford), but only within the last generation. The BD (Bachelor of Divinity) remains a higher degree at some universities (e.g. Oxford, Cambridge, St Andrews and, until recently, Durham) but is an undergraduate degree at most (e.g. London, Edinburgh, Aberdeen and Glasgow).

Bachelor's degrees in medicine, dentistry and veterinary science, while undergraduate degrees, are longer courses and are considered to be master's level qualifications in the Framework for Higher Education Qualifications and second cycle qualifications under the Bologna Process.

=== Bachelor/Master/Doctor of Philosophy ===
There is an international (but not universal) custom that certain degrees will be designated '.... of Philosophy'. Examples are the BPhil (Bachelor of Philosophy), MPhil (Master of Philosophy) and PhD or DPhil (Doctor of Philosophy). Most recipients of such degrees have not engaged in a specialised study of academic philosophy – the degree is available for almost the whole range of disciplines. The origins lie in the ancient practice of regarding all areas of study as elements of 'philosophy' with its Greek meaning, 'friend of wisdom'. Thus holders of an MPhil degree may have earned it in any academic discipline.

== Foundation level qualifications ==
Foundation degree qualifications are at level 5 of the Framework for Higher Education Qualifications. They are classified under the Bologna Process as short cycle (within or linked to the first cycle) qualifications.

The prepositions in the qualifications' names as awarded vary between institutions and are sometimes omitted.

- FdA, FDA, FDArts – Foundation Degree [in/of/of the] Arts
- FdEd, FDEd – Foundation Degree [in/of] Education
- FdEng – Foundation Degree [in/of] Engineering
- FDS, FDSc – Foundation Degree [in/of] Science

== Bachelor's level qualifications ==
These qualifications sit at level 6 (bachelor's level) of the Framework for Higher Education Qualifications and are first cycle (end of cycle) qualifications under the Bologna Process.

Most British bachelor's degrees are honours degrees and indicated by putting "(Hons)" after the degree abbreviation. A student achieving a pass grade, below honours standard, may be awarded an "ordinary degree" or a "pass degree" and may not add "(Hons)".

As noted above, the MAs of the ancient universities of Scotland are also at this level and may also add "(Hons)" after their acronyms. Both these and bachelor's degrees with honours at Scottish universities are four-year courses at level 10 of the Framework for Qualifications of Higher Education Institutes in Scotland. Scottish bachelor's degrees without honours (including non-honours MAs from the ancient universities of Scotland) are three-year course with less specialisation (an Ordinary Degree or a General Degree) at level 9 of the Framework for Qualifications of Higher Education Institutes in Scotland.

Some of the following are postgraduate degrees in a few universities, but generally bachelors are undergraduate degrees.

- AgrB – Bachelor of Agriculture
- BA – Bachelor of Arts
  - BA(Admin) – Bachelor of Arts in Administration
  - BACom – Bachelor of Arts in Commerce
  - BAEcon – Bachelor of Arts in Economics
  - BA(Ed) – Bachelor of Arts in Education
  - BA(FS) – Bachelor of Arts in Financial Studies
  - BAI – Bachelor of Arts in Engineering (Arte Ingeniaria)
    - BAI(Elect) – Bachelor of Arts in Electrical Engineering
    - BAI(Mech) – Bachelor of Arts in Mechanical Engineering
  - BALaw – Bachelor of Arts in Law
  - BAO – Bachelor of Arts in Obstetrics (Arte Obstetricia)
  - BARelSt – Bachelor of Arts on Religious Studies
  - BASc – Bachelor of Arts and Science
  - BASoc – Bachelor of Arts in Sociology
  - BATheol – Bachelor of Arts in Theology
- BA/BSc – Bachelor of Arts/Bachelor of Science
- BAcc – Bachelor of Accounting
- BAdmin – Bachelor of Administration
- BAgr – Bachelor of Agriculture
- BAH – Bachelor of Animal Health
- BArch – Bachelor of Architecture
- BArchSc – Bachelor of Architectural Science
- BBA – Bachelor of Business Administration
- BBLS – Bachelor of Business and Legal Studies
- BBS – Bachelor of Business Studies
- BBus – Bachelor of Business
- BChem – Bachelor of Chemistry
- BCL – Bachelor of Civil Law
- BCLD(SocSc) – Bachelor of Community Learning and Development in Social Sciences
- BClinSci – Bachelor of Clinical Science
- BCom – Bachelor of Commerce
- BCombSt – Bachelor of Combined Studies
- BCommEdCommDev – Bachelor of Community Education and Community Development
- BComSc – Bachelor of Commercial Science
- BD – Bachelor of Divinity
- BDes – Bachelor of Design
- BDiv – Bachelor of Divinity
- BEconSc – Bachelor of Economic Science
- BEconSci – Bachelor of Science in Economics
- BEd – Bachelor of Education
- BEng – Bachelor of Engineering
- BES – Bachelor of Engineering Studies
- BEng(Tech) – Bachelor of Engineering in Technology
- BEng/BSc – Bachelor of Engineering, Bachelor of Science
- BFA – Bachelor of Fine Art
- BFin – Bachelor of Finance
- BFLS – Bachelor of Financial and Legal Studies
- BFST – Bachelor of Food Science and Technology
- BH – Bachelor of Humanities
- BHealthSc – Bachelor of Health Sciences
- BHSc – Bachelor of Health Science
- BHy – Bachelor of Hygiene
- BIBA – Bachelor of International Business Administration
- BJur – Bachelor of Jurisprudence
- BL – Bachelor of Law
- BLE – Bachelor of Land Economy
- BLegSc – Bachelor of Legal Science
- BLib – Bachelor of Librarianship
- BLing – Bachelor of Linguistics
- BLitt – Bachelor of Letters or Bachelor of Literature
- BLittCelt – Bachelor of Celtic Letters
- BLS – Bachelor of Library Studies
- BM – Bachelor of Medicine
- BM – Bachelor of Midwifery
- BMedSc – Bachelor of Medical Science(s)
- BMedSci – Bachelor in Medical Science
- BMet – Bachelor of Metallurgy
- BMid – Bachelor of Midwifery
- BMidWif – Bachelor of Midwifery
- BMin – Bachelor of Ministry
- BMS – Bachelor of Midwifery Studies
- BMSc – Bachelor of Medical Science
- BMus – Bachelor of Music
- BMusEd – Bachelor of Music Education
- BMusPerf – Bachelor of Music Performance
- BN – Bachelor of Nursing
- BNatSci – Bachelor in Natural Science
- BNS – Bachelor of Nursing Studies
- BNurs – Bachelor of Nursing
- BOptom – Bachelor of Optometry
- BOst – Bachelor of Osteopathy
- BPA – Bachelor of Public Administration
- BPA – Bachelor of Performing Arts
- BPharm – Bachelor of Pharmacy
- BPhil – Bachelor of Philosophy
- BPhil(Ed) – Bachelor of Philosophy in Education
- BPhys – Bachelor of Physics
- BPhysio – Bachelor of Physiotherapy
- BPl – Bachelor of Planning
- BRadiog – Bachelor of Radiography
- BSc – Bachelor of Science
  - BScAgr – Bachelor of Science in Agriculture
  - BSc(Dairy) – Bachelor of Science in Dairying
  - BScD – Bachelor of Science in Dentistry
  - BSc(DomSc) – Bachelor of Science in Domestic Science
  - BScEc – Bachelor of Science in Economic and Social Studies
  - BScEcon – Bachelor of Science in Economic Science or Bachelor of Economic and Social Studies
  - BSc(Econ) – Bachelor of Science in Economics
  - BSc(Ed) – Bachelor of Science in Education
  - BSc(Eng) – Bachelor of Science in Engineering
  - BScFor – Bachelor of Science in Forestry
  - BScHW – Bachelor of Science in Health and Wellbeing
  - BSc(HealthSc) – Bachelor of Science in Health Science
  - BSc(Hort) – Bachelor of Science in Horticulture
  - BSc(MCRM) – Bachelor of Science in Marine and Coastal Reserve Management
  - BSc(Med) – Bachelor of Science in Medicine
  - BSc(Mid) – Bachelor of Science in Midwifery
  - BSc(Min) – Bachelor of Science in Mining
  - BSc(Psych) – Bachelor of Science in Psychology
  - BScHSc – Bachelor of Science in Health Sciences
  - BScPH – Bachelor of Science in Public Health
  - BScTech – Bachelor of Science in Technology
- BSocSc – Bachelor of Social Sciences
- BSS – Bachelor of Social Studies
- BSt – Bachelor of Studies
- BStSu – Bachelor of Deaf Studies
- BSW – Bachelor of Social Work
- BTCP – Bachelor of Town and County Planning
- BTech – Bachelor of Technology (not to be confused with BTEC)
- BTechEd – Bachelor of Technological Education
- BTh – Bachelor of Theology
- BTheol – Bachelor of Theology
- BTS – Bachelor of Theatre Studies
- EdB – Bachelor of Education
- LittB – Bachelor of Literature or Bachelor of Letters
- LLB – Bachelor of Laws
  - LLB(Eur) Bachelor of Laws (European)
- MA – Master of Arts (bachelor's level at some Scottish universities)
  - MA(SocSci) – Master of Arts (Social Sciences)
- MusB – Bachelor of Music
- ScBTech – Bachelor of Science in Technology

== Master's level qualifications ==
These qualifications sit at level 7 (master's level) of the Framework for Higher Education Qualifications and are second cycle qualifications under the Bologna Process.

=== Undergraduate-entry degrees ===
Undergraduate-entry "Integrated master's" degrees are offered with honours, and so may add (hons) after the degree abbreviation. These are substantive master's degrees integrating undergraduate and master's level study, with the final qualification being at the same level as postgraduate master's.

Primary qualifications in medicine, dentistry and veterinary medicine are taken as undergraduate-entry courses and are denominated bachelor's degrees, but are normally offered without honours These are also qualifications at the same level as postgraduate master's degrees, but retain the name of bachelor's for historical reasons. The Bachelors of Medicine and Surgery are always taken together as the primary medical qualification in the UK, equivalent to the American MD.

Note that where there is a similarly titled postgraduate master's degree, the formulation " Master in ..." is used for the undergraduate degree and "Master of ..." for the postgraduate degree (e.g. MArt/MA, MSci/MSc). Where there is no equivalent postgraduate degree, either "in" or "of" is used.

==== Integrated master's degrees ====
- MAcc – Master in Accountancy
- MAccFin – Master of Accounting and Finance
- MAnth – Master in Anthropology
- MArabic – Master of Arabic Studies
- MArc – Master of Archaeology
- MArch – Master of Architecture
- MArt – Master in Arts
- MART – Master of Art
- MBio – Master of Biomedical Sciences, Master of Biological Sciences
- MBiochem – Master of Biochemistry
- MBiol – Master of Biology or Master in Biological Sciences
- MBiolSci – Master of Biological Science
- MBiomed – Master in Biomedical Sciences
- MBioMedSci – Master of Biomedical Science
- MBioms – Master of Biomedical Sciences
- MBus – Master in Business and Management or Master of Business
- MChD – Master in Dental Surgery
- MChem – Master of Chemistry
- MChemPhys – Master of Chemical Physics
- MChiro – Master of Chiropractic
- MClass – Master of Classical Studies
- MClassL – Master of Classical Languages
- MComp – Master of Computer Science or Master of Computing
- MCompPhil – Master of Computer Science and Philosophy
- MCompSci – Master of Computer Science
- MComSC – Master of Community and Social Care
- M.CMAc – Master of Chinese Medicine, Acupuncture
- MCreW – Master of Creative Writing
- MDiv – Master of Divinity
- MDes – Master of Design
- MDrama – Master of Drama and Theatre Studies
- MEarthPhys – Master of Earth Physics
- MEarthSci – Master of Earth Science
- MEcol – Master of Ecology
- MEcon – Master of Economics
- MEdStud – Master of Education Studies
- MEng – Master of Engineering
- MEngLit – Master of English
- MEnv – Master of Environmental Science
- MEnvSc – Master of Environmental Science
- MESci – Master of Earth Science
- MFin – Master of Finance
- MFor – Master of Forestry
- MGeog – Master of Geography
- MGeogSCI – Master of Geographical Science
- MGeol – Master of Geology
- MGeophys – Master of Geophysics
- MGeoSci – Master in Geology
- MHist – Master of History
- MHRM – Master of Human Resource Management
- MInf – Master of Informatics
- MLA – Master of Landscape Architecture
- MLang – Master of Languages
- MLaw – Master of Law
- MLibArts – Master of Liberal Arts
- MLing – Master of Linguistics
- MMarBiol – Master of Marine Biology
- MMark – Master in Marketing
- MMath – Master of Mathematics
- MMath&Phys – Master of Mathematics and Physics
- MMathCompSci – Master of Mathematics and Computer Science
- MMathPhil – Master of Mathematics and Philosophy
- MMathPhys – Master of Mathematics and Physics
- MMathStat – Master of Mathematics and Statistics
- MMBiol – Master of Marine Biology
- MME – Master of Mechanical Engineering
- MMedSci – Master of Medical Science
- MMet – Master of Meteorology
- MMkt – Master in Marketing
- MMorse – Master of Mathematics, Operational Research, Statistics and Economics
- MMSc – Master of Marine Science
- MNatSc – Master of Natural Science
- MNeuro – Master in Neuroscience
- MNeuroSci – Master of Neuroscience
- MNSW – Master of Nursing and Social Work
- MNurs – Master of Nursing
- MNursSci – Master of Nursing Science
- MNutr – Master of Nutrition
- MOcean – Master of Oceanography
- MOptom – Master of Optometry
- MOSci – Master of Ocean Science
- MOst – Master of Osteopathy
- M.Ost. – Master of Osteopathy
- MPharm – Master of Pharmacy
- MPharmacol – Master of Pharmacology
- MPhilSt – Master of Philosophical Studies
- MPhyPhil – Master of Physics and Philosophy
- MPhys – Master of Physics
- MPhysio – Master of Physiotherapy
- MPhysPhil – Master of Physics and Philosophy
- MPlan – Master of Town and Regional Planning
- MPLAN – Master of Planning
- MPol – Master of Politics and International Relations
- MPsych – Master of Psychology
- MRelSt – Master of Religious Studies
- MSci – Master in Science (Master of Natural Sciences at Cambridge)
- MScOT or MScOccTher – Master of Science in Occupational Therapy
- MSLT – Master of Speech and Language Therapy
- MSoc – Master of Sociology
- MSocStud – Master of Social Studies
- MSPRT – Master of Sport
- MStat – Master of Statistics
- MTheatre – Master of Theatre
- MTheol – Master in Theology
- MTCP – Master of Town and Country Planning
- MVetPhys – Master of Veterinary Physiotherapy
- MZOOL – Master of Zoology

==== Primary dental qualifications ====
- BChD – Bachelor of Dental Surgery
- BDOS – Bachelor of Dental and Oral Sciences
- BDS – Bachelor of Dental Surgery
- DDS – Doctor of Dental Surgery

==== Primary medical qualifications ====
- BMBS – Bachelors of Medicine and Surgery or Bachelor of Medicine, Bachelor of Surgery
- BMBCh – Bachelors of Medicine and Surgery
- MB, BChir – Bachelor of Medicine and Bachelor of Surgery
- MBBCh – Bachelor of Medicine, Bachelor of Surgery
- MBBS – Bachelors of Medicine and Surgery or Bachelor of Medicine, Bachelor of Surgery
- MBChB – Bachelors of Medicine and Surgery or Bachelor of Medicine, Bachelor of Surgery
- MD – Doctor of Medicine

==== Primary veterinary qualifications ====
- BVS – Bachelor of Veterinary Surgery
- BVetM – Bachelor of Veterinary Medicine
- BVetMed – Bachelor of Veterinary Medicine
- BVM&S – Bachelor of Veterinary Medicine and Surgery
- BVMBVS – Bachelor of Veterinary Medicine, Bachelor of Veterinary Science
- BVMedSci – Bachelor of Veterinary Medical Science
- BVMS – Bachelor of Veterinary Medicine
- BVMSci – Bachelor of Veterinary Medicine and Science
- BVSc – Bachelor of Veterinary Science
- VetMB – Bachelor of Veterinary Medicine

=== Postgraduate degrees ===
Postgraduate master's degrees may be either taught degrees or research degrees. Taught master's degrees may be awarded by an institution with taught degree awarding powers; master's degrees by research (e g MPhil, MRes), where over half of the student's effort is in original research, require research degree awarding powers. Postgraduate degrees are not normally honours degrees and thus do not add "(Hons)". Some degrees may be offered as either integrated master's or postgraduate master's courses at different institutes, e.g. MEng and MArch.

A few postgraduate degrees at Oxford are titled as bachelor's degrees. These are, nonetheless, master's level qualifications.

- BCL – Bachelor of Civil Law (Oxford)
- BPhil – Bachelor of Philosophy (Oxford)
- EMBS – European Master in Business Sciences
- IntM – International Master (awarded by Glasgow in consortium with non-UK universities)
- LLM – Master of Laws (Master of Law at Cambridge)
  - LLM(Res) Master of Laws (Research)
- MA – Master of Arts
- MArch – Master of Architecture
- MASt – Master of Advanced Study
- MBA – Master of Business Administration
- MBL – Master of Business and Law
- MComp – Master of Composition
- MCD – Master of Civic Design
- MCh – Master of Surgery
- MCL – Master of Corporate Law
- MClinDent – Master of Clinical Dentistry
- MDes – Master of Design
- MEd – Master of Education
- MEng – Master of Engineering
  - MEng(Eur) – Master of Engineering (European)
- MEP – Master of Educational Practice
- MFA – Master of Fine Art
- HMHW – Higher Master in Health and Wellbeing
- MJur – Master of Jurisprudence (Law) (Magister Juris at Oxford)
- MLaw – Master in Law
- MLib – Master of Librarianship
- MLit – Master of Literature
- MLitt – Master of Letters
- MMin – Master of Ministry
- MMus – Master of Music
- MPA – Master of Public Administration
- MPerf – Master of Performance
- MPH – Master of Public Health
- MPhil – Master of Philosophy (under the Framework, the MPhil is "normally reserved" for longer master's courses with a significant research element, or for PhD candidates who do not reach sufficient level for the award of a doctorate)
- MPP – Master of Public Policy
- MProf – Master of Professional Studies or Master of Professional Practice
- MRes – Master in Research
  - MbyRes – Master by Research
- MSc – Master of Science
  - MSc(Eur) – Master of Science (European)
  - MScEcon – Master of Economic and Social Studies
  - MScD – Master of Science in Dental Science
  - MScHW – Master of Science in Health and Wellbeing
- MSt – Master of Studies
- MSW – Master of Social Work
- MTeach – Master of Teaching
- MTL – Master of Teaching and Learning
- MTh – Master of Theology
- MTheol – Master of Theology
- MUniv – Master of the University (the MUniv is only ever an honorary degree)
- MusM – Master of Music

== Doctoral degrees ==
UK doctoral degrees are at level 8 of the Framework for Higher Education Qualifications and are third cycle qualifications under the Bologna Process. All doctoral degrees include "original research or other advanced scholarship" demonstrating "the creation and interpretation of new knowledge".

Due to the flexibility of Latin word order, there are two schools in the abbreviation of doctor's degrees. The two ancient universities of England split on this: at Cambridge, D follows the faculty (e.g. PhD, LittD.), while at Oxford the D precedes the faculty (e.g. DPhil, DLitt). Most universities in the UK followed Oxford for the higher doctorates but followed international precedent in using PhD for Doctor of Philosophy and professional doctorates.

The Framework for Higher Education Qualifications lays down the naming convention that Doctor of Philosophy is reserved for doctorates awarded on the basis of examination by thesis or publication, or by artefact, composition or performance accompanied by written academic commentary. Other doctorates (typically styled professional or specialist doctorates) that have substantial taught elements normally include the field in the name of the degree.

Higher doctorates are normally awarded as honorary degrees (honoris causa), but can also be awarded on the basis of a substantial body of published work. DUniv is only ever an honorary degree. Some degrees awarded as higher doctorates by one institution may be awarded as professional doctorates by another (e.g. EngD).

=== Professional / specialist doctorates ===
- AdminD – Doctor of Administration
- AMusD – Doctor of Musical Arts
- ClinPsyD – Doctor of Clinical Psychology
- DAHP – Doctor of Advanced Healthcare Practice
- DAP – Doctor of Academic Practice
- DAppEdPsy – Doctor of Applied Educational Psychology
- DBA – Doctor of Business Administration
- DBAEngTech – Doctor of Business Administration Engineering Technology
- DBL – Doctor of Business Leadership
- DBS – Doctor of Biomedical Science
- DClinPrac – Doctor of Clinical Practice
- DClinPsy – Doctor of Clinical Psychology
- DClinPsych – Doctor of Clinical Psychology or Doctor of Clinical and Community Psychology
- DCouns – Doctor of Counselling
- DClinSci – Doctor of Clinical Science
- DDP – Doctor of Design Practice
- DDS – Doctor of Dental Surgery
- DEd – Doctor of Education
- DEdChPsy – Doctor of Educational and Child Psychology
- DEdPsy – Doctor of Educational Psychology
- DEng – Doctor of Engineering (awarded as a higher doctorate by some universities)
- DFA – Doctor of Fine Arts
- DFin – Doctor of Finance
- DFT – Doctor of Family Therapy
- DForenPsy – Doctor of Forensic Psychology
- DHealthPsy – Doctor of Health Psychology
- DHC – Doctor of Health Care
- DHS – Doctor of Health Studies
- DHSc – Doctor of Health Science
- DHum – Doctor of Humanities
- DHy – Doctor of Hygiene
- DLang – Doctor of Languages
- DM – Doctor of Medicine (awarded by thesis at some universities; awarded as a higher doctorate at some universities)
- DMA – Doctor of Musical Arts
- DMan – Doctor of Management
- DMet – Doctor of Metallurgy
- DMin – Doctor of Ministry
- DMus – Doctor of Music (awarded as a higher doctorate at some universities)
- DMW – Doctor of Midwifery
- DNurs – Doctor of Nursing
- DNursSc – Doctor of Nursing Science
- DOccTher – Doctor of Occupational Therapy
- DOT – Doctor of Occupational Therapy
- DPA – Doctor of Public Administration
- DPH – Doctor of Public Health
- DProf – Doctor of Professional Studies
- DProfCounsPsy – Professional Doctorate in Counseling Psychology
- DProfHW – Professional Doctorate in Health and Wellbeing
- DPS – Doctor of Professional Studies
- DPT – Doctor of Physiotherapy
  - DPhysio – Doctor of Physiotherapy
- DPT – Doctor of Physical Therapy
- DPT – Doctor of Practical Theology or Practical Theology Doctorate
- DSocCare – Doctor of Social Care
- DSportExPsy – Doctor of Sport and Exercise Psychology
- DSportExSci – Doctor of Applied Sport and Exercise Science
- DSW – Doctor of Social Work
- DTh – Doctor of Practical Theology
- DThM – Doctor of Theology and Ministry
- DTour – Doctor of Tourism
- EdChPsychD – Doctor of Educational and Child Psychology
- EdD – Doctor of Education
- EDD – Professional Doctorate in Education
- EdPsychD – Doctor of Educational Psychology
- EngD – Doctor of Engineering or Engineering Doctorate
- EntD – Doctor of Enterprise
- HScD – Doctor of Health Science
- JD – Juris Doctor
- MD – Doctor of Medicine (awarded by thesis at some universities; awarded as a higher doctorate at some universities)
- MusD – Doctor of Music (awarded as a higher doctorate at some universities)
- PsychD – Doctor of Psychology
- SocSciD – Doctor of Social Sciences
- SocScD – Doctor of Social Science
- SPPD – Doctor of Social and Public Policy
- ThD – Doctor of Theology

=== Doctorates by thesis or composition ===
- DDS – Doctor of Dental Surgery
- DNursSci -Doctor in Nursing Science
- DPhil – Doctor of Philosophy
- MD – Doctor of Medicine
  - MD(Res) – Doctor of Medicine (Research)
- PhD – Doctor of Philosophy

=== Higher and honorary degrees ===
- DCh – Doctor of Surgery
- DCL – Doctor of Civil Law
- DD – Doctor of Divinity
- DDS – Doctor of Dental Surgery
- DDSc – Doctor of Dental Science
- DEd – Doctor of Education
- DHL – Doctor of Humane Letters
- DLitt – Doctor of Letters
- DLit – Doctor of Literature
  - DLit(Ed) – Doctor of Literature (Education)
- DM – Doctor of Medicine
- DMus – Doctor of Music
  - Hon DMus – Honorary Doctor of Music
- Dr.h.c. or Dr.(h.c.) – Doctor honoris causa
- DSc – Doctor of Science
  - DSc(Econ) – Doctor of Science (Economics)
  - DSc(Eng) – Doctor of Science (Engineering)
  - DSc(Med) – Doctor of Science (Medicine)
  - DSc (Social Science) – Doctor of Science in Social Science
- DScEcon – Doctor of Economic and Social Studies
- DTech – Doctor of Technology
- DUniv – Doctor of the University
- DVM&S – Doctor of Veterinary Medicine and Surgery
- EngD – Doctor of Engineering
- LittD – Doctor of Letters
- LLD – Doctor of Laws
- ScD – Doctor of Science
- MA(h.c.) – Honorary Master of Arts (Oxford, Dublin and Cambridge)

== See also ==
- Post-nominal letters
- Foundation degree
- List of British universities
- Degrees of the University of Oxford
- British undergraduate degree classification
