= Master's degree =

Postgraduate educational qualification

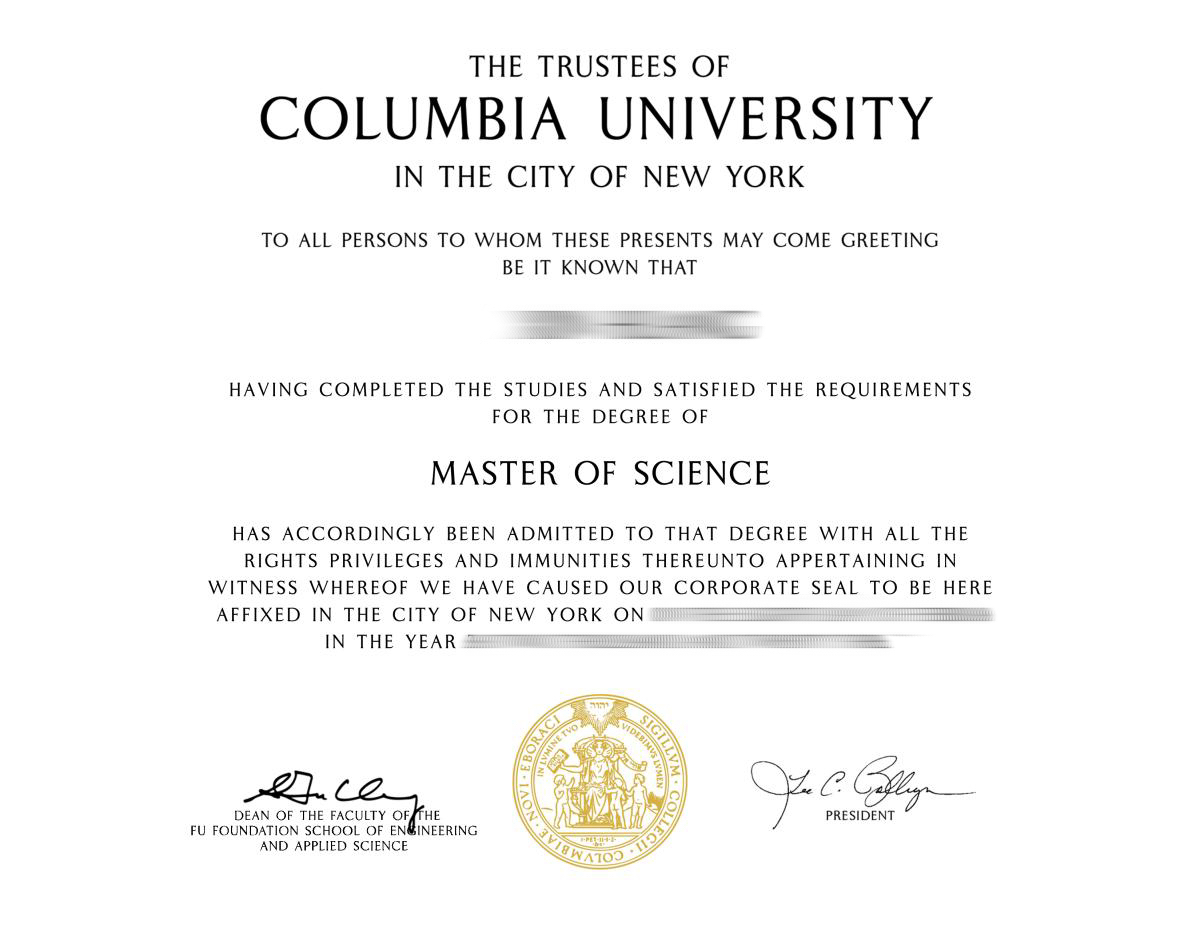
A Master of Science degree conferred by Columbia University in New York City

A master's degree (Note: The spelling of master's degree and master's without an apostrophe is considered a mistake by many (see non-standard apostrophe use), but it is becoming more common. It is considered incorrect by most if not all US and most UK and Australian universities, style guides, and dictionaries, for example: OED, Collins, Cambridge Dictionaries Online, American Heritage (master's), American Heritage (master's degree), Merriam-Webster, and the Macquarie Dictionary as shown in the following Monash University quotation. Monash University's style guide directly admits that the incorrectly missing apostrophe used to be more widespread in publications of this and therefore presumably other Australian universities: "Note that both 'bachelor's degree' and 'master's degree', when used in a generic sense, require an apostrophe. While some dislike this convention, it is prescribed by the Macquarie Dictionary (the Australian standard) and the Oxford English Dictionary (the UK standard), and aligns with our key institutional partner Warwick University. Currently, you will find the terms used both with and without an apostrophe throughout our online and print publications – gradually, we need to move toward correct usage.") (from Latin magister) is a postgraduate academic degree awarded by universities or colleges upon completion of a course of study demonstrating mastery or a high-order overview of a specific field of study or area of professional practice. A master's degree normally requires previous study at the bachelor's level, either as a separate degree or as part of an integrated course. Within the area studied, master's graduates are expected to possess advanced knowledge of a specialized body of theoretical and applied topics; high order skills in analysis, critical evaluation, or professional application; and the ability to solve complex problems and think rigorously and independently.

== Historical development ==
=== Medieval era to 18th century ===
The master's degree dates back to the origin of European universities, with a papal bull of 1233 decreeing that anyone admitted to the mastership in the University of Toulouse should be allowed to teach freely in any other university. The original meaning of the master's degree was thus that someone who had been admitted to the rank (degree) of master (i.e. teacher) in one university should be admitted to the same rank in other universities. This gradually became formalised as the licentia docendī (licence to teach). Originally, masters and doctors were not distinguished, but by the 15th century it had become customary in the English universities to refer to the teachers in the lower faculties (arts and grammar) as masters and those in the higher faculties as doctors. Initially, the Bachelor of Arts (BA) was awarded for the study of the trivium and the Master of Arts (MA) for the study of the quadrivium.

From the late Middle Ages until the 19th century, the pattern of degrees was therefore to have a bachelor's and master's degree in the lower faculties and to have bachelor's and doctorates in the higher faculties. In the United States, the first master's degrees (Magister Artium, or Master of Arts) were awarded at Harvard University soon after its foundation. In Scotland, the pre-Reformation universities (St Andrews, Glasgow, and Aberdeen) developed so that the Master of Arts became their first degree, while in Oxford, Cambridge, and Trinity College Dublin, the MA was awarded to BA graduates of a certain standing without further examination from the late 17th century, its main purpose being to confer full membership of the university. At Harvard, the 1700 regulations required that candidates for the master's degree had to pass a public examination, but by 1835, this was awarded Oxbridge-style three years after the BA.

=== 19th century ===
The 19th century saw a great expansion in the variety of master's degrees offered. At the start of the century, the only master's degree was the MA, and this was normally awarded without any further study or examination. The Master in Surgery degree was introduced by the University of Glasgow in 1815. By 1861, this had been adopted throughout Scotland as well as by Cambridge and Durham in England and the University of Dublin in Ireland. When the Philadelphia College of Surgeons was established in 1870, it too conferred the Master of Surgery, "the same as that in Europe".

In Scotland, Edinburgh maintained separate BA and MA degrees until the mid-19th century, although there were major doubts as to the quality of the Scottish degrees of this period. In 1832 Lord Brougham, the Lord Chancellor and an alumnus of the University of Edinburgh, told the House of Lords that "In England the Universities conferred degrees after a considerable period of residence, after much labour performed, and if they were not in all respects so rigorous as the statutes of the Universities required, nevertheless it could not be said, that Masters of Arts were created at Oxford and Cambridge as they were in Scotland, without any residence, or without some kind of examination. In Scotland, all the statutes of the Universities which enforced conditions on the grant of degrees were a dead letter."

It 1837, separate examinations were reintroduced for the MA in England, at the newly established Durham University (even though, as in the ancient English universities, this was to confer full membership), to be followed in 1840 by the similarly new University of London, which was only empowered by its charter to grant degrees by examination. However, by the middle of the century the MA as an examined second degree was again under threat, with Durham moving to awarding it automatically to those who gained honours in the BA in 1857, along the lines of the Oxbridge MA, and Edinburgh following the other Scottish universities in awarding the MA as its first degree, in place of the BA, from 1858. At the same time, new universities were being established around the then British Empire along the lines of London, including examinations for the MA: the University of Sydney in Australia and the Queen's University of Ireland in 1850, and the Universities of Bombay (now the University of Mumbai), Madras and Calcutta in India in 1857.

In the US, the revival of master's degrees as an examined qualification began in 1856 at the University of North Carolina, followed by the University of Michigan in 1859, although the idea of a master's degree as an earned second degree was not well established until the 1870s, alongside the PhD as the terminal degree. Sometimes it was possible to earn an MA either by examination or by seniority in the same institution; for example, in Michigan the "in course" MA was introduced in 1848 and was last awarded in 1882, while the "on examination" MA was introduced in 1859.

The Master of Science (MS in the US, MSc in the UK), was introduced at the University of Michigan in two forms in 1858: "in course", first awarded in 1859, and "on examination", first awarded in 1862. The "in course" MS was last awarded in 1876. In Britain, however, the degree took a while longer to arrive. When London introduced its Faculty of Sciences in 1858, the university was granted a new charter giving it the power "to confer the several Degrees of Bachelor, Master, and Doctor, in Arts, Laws, Science, Medicine, Music", but the degrees it awarded in science were the Bachelor of Science and the Doctor of Science. The same two degrees, again omitting the master's, were awarded at Edinburgh, despite the MA being the standard undergraduate degree for Arts in Scotland. In 1862, a royal commission suggested that Durham should award master's degrees in theology and science (with the suggested abbreviations MT and MS, contrary to later British practice of using MTh or MTheol and MSc for these degrees), but its recommendations were not enacted. In 1877, Oxford introduced the Master of Natural Science, along with the Bachelor of Natural Science, to stand alongside the MA and BA degrees and be awarded to students who took their degrees in the honours school of natural sciences. In 1879 a statute to actually establish the faculty of Natural Sciences at Oxford was promulgated, but in 1880 a proposal to rename the degree as a Master of Science was rejected along with a proposal to grant Masters of Natural Sciences a Master of Arts degree, in order to make them full members of the university. This scheme would appear to have then been quietly dropped, with Oxford going on to award BAs and MAs in science.

The Master of Science (MSc) degree was finally introduced in Britain in 1878 at Durham, followed by the new Victoria University in 1881. At the Victoria University both the MA and MSc followed the lead of Durham's MA in requiring a further examination for those with an ordinary bachelor's degree but not for those with honours.

=== 20th century ===
At the start of the 20th century, there were four different sorts of master's degree in the UK: the Scottish MA, granted as a first degree; the Master of Arts (Oxbridge and Dublin), granted to all BA graduates a certain period after their first degree without further study; master's degrees that could be gained either by further study or by gaining an honours degree (which, at the time in the UK involved further study beyond the ordinary degree, as it still does in Scotland and some Commonwealth countries); and master's degrees that could only be obtained by further study (including all London master's degrees). In 1903, the London Daily News criticised the practice of Oxford and Cambridge, calling their MAs "the most stupendous of academic frauds" and "bogus degrees". Ensuing correspondence pointed out that "A Scotch M.A., at the most, is only the equivalent of an English B.A." and called for common standards for degrees, while defenders of the ancient universities said that "the Cambridge M.A. does not pretend to be a reward of learning" and that "it is rather absurd to describe one of their degrees as a bogus one because other modern Universities grant the same degree for different reasons".

In 1900, Dartmouth College introduced the Master of Commercial Science (MCS), first awarded in 1902. This was the first master's degree in business, the forerunner of the modern MBA. The idea quickly crossed the Atlantic, with Manchester establishing a Faculty of Commerce, awarding Bachelor and Master of Commerce degrees, in 1903. Over the first half of the century the automatic master's degrees for honours graduates vanished as honours degrees became the standard undergraduate qualification in the UK. In the 1960s, new Scottish universities (except for Dundee, which inherited the undergraduate MA from St Andrews) reintroduced the BA as their undergraduate degree in arts, restoring the MA to its position as a postgraduate qualification. Oxford and Cambridge retained their MAs, but renamed many of their postgraduate bachelor's degrees in the higher faculties as master's degrees, e.g. the Cambridge LLB became the LLM in 1982, and the Oxford BLitt, BPhil (except in philosophy) and BSc became the MLitt, MPhil, and MSc.

In 1983, the Engineering Council issued a "'Statement on enhanced and extended undergraduate engineering degree courses", proposing the establishment of a four-year first degree (Master of Engineering). These were up and running by the mid-1980s and were followed in the early 1990s by the MPhys for physicists and since then integrated master's degrees in other sciences such as MChem, MMath, and MGeol, and in some institutions general or specific MSci (Master in Science) and MArts (Master in Arts) degrees. This development was noted by the Dearing Report into UK Higher Education in 1997, which called for the establishment of a national framework of qualifications and identified five different routes to master's degrees:

- Four year (five in Scotland) first degrees in certain subjects, such as the MEng
- Conversion degrees, sometimes below the standard of undergraduate degrees in the same subject
- The honours arts undergraduate degree awarded by the four ancient universities of Scotland
- Postgraduate programmes, such as the MA, MSt, and MSc
- The Oxford and Cambridge MA, and MA from Trinity College Dublin, awarded without additional study several years after the award of a BA.

This led to the establishment of the Quality Assurance Agency, which was charged with drawing up the framework.

=== 21st century ===
The Bologna declaration in 1999 started the Bologna Process, leading to the creation of the European Higher Education Area (EHEA). This established a three-cycle bachelor's—master's—doctorate classification of degrees, leading to the adoption of master's degrees across the continent, often replacing older long-cycle qualifications such as the Magister (arts), Diplom (sciences) and state registration (professional) awards in Germany. As the process continued, descriptors were introduced for all three levels in 2004, and ECTS credit guidelines were developed. This led to questions as to the status of the integrated master's degrees and one-year master's degrees in the UK. However, the Framework for Higher Education Qualifications in England, Wales and Northern Ireland and the Framework for Qualifications of Higher Education Institutes in Scotland have both been aligned with the overarching framework for the EHEA with these being accepted as masters-level qualifications.

In 2000, renewed pressure was put on Oxbridge MAs in the UK Parliament, with Labour MP Jackie Lawrence introducing an early day motion calling for them to be scrapped and telling the Times Higher Education it was a "discriminatory practice" and that it "devalues and undermines the efforts of students at other universities". The following month the Quality Assurance Agency announced the results of a survey of 150 major employers showing nearly two thirds mistakenly thought the Cambridge MA was a postgraduate qualification and just over half made the same error regarding the Edinburgh MA, with QAA chief executive John Randall calling the Oxbridge MA "misleading and anachronistic".

The QAA released the first "framework for higher education qualifications in England, Wales and Northern Ireland" in January 2001. This specified learning outcomes for M-level (master's) degrees and advised that the title "Master" should only be used for qualifications that met those learning outcomes in full. It addressed many of the Dearing Report's concerns, specifying that shorter courses at H-level (honours), e.g. conversion courses, should be styled Graduate Diploma or Graduate Certificate rather than as master's degrees, but confirmed that the extended undergraduate degrees were master's degrees, saying that "Some Masters degrees in science and engineering are awarded after extended undergraduate programmes that last, typically, a year longer than Honours degree programmes". It also addressed the Oxbridge MA issue, noting that "the MAs granted by the Universities of Oxford and Cambridge are not academic qualifications". The first "framework for qualifications of Higher Education Institutes in Scotland", also published in January 2001, used the same qualifications descriptors, adding in credit values that specified that a stand-alone master should be 180 credits and a "Masters (following an integrated programme from undergraduate to Masters level study)" should be 600 credits with a minimum of 120 at M-level. It was specified that the title "Master" should only be used for qualifications that met the learning outcomes and credit definitions, although it was noted that "A small number of universities in Scotland have a long tradition of labelling certain first degrees as 'MA'. Reports of Agency reviews of such provision will relate to undergraduate benchmarks and will make it clear that the title reflects Scottish custom and practice, and that any positive judgement on standards should not be taken as implying that the outcomes of the programme were at postgraduate level."

== Titles ==
Master's degrees are commonly titled using the form 'Master of ...', where either a faculty (typically Arts or Science) or a field (Engineering, Physics, Chemistry, Business Administration, etc.) is specified. The two most common titles of master's degrees are the Master of Arts (MA/AM) and Master of Science (MSc/MS/SM) degrees, which normally consist of a mixture of research and taught material.

The title of Master of Philosophy (MPhil) indicates (in the same manner as Doctor of Philosophy) an extended degree with a large research component. Other generically named master's programs include the Master of Studies (MSt)/Master of Advanced Study (MASt)/Master of Advanced Studies (M.A.S.), and Professional Master's (MProf). Integrated master's degrees and postgraduate master's degrees oriented towards professional practice are often more specifically named for their field of study ("tagged degrees"), including, for example, Master of Business Administration, Master of Divinity, Master of Engineering, Master of Physics, and Master of Public Health.

The form "Master in ..." is also sometimes used, particularly where a faculty title is used for an integrated master's degree in addition to its use in a traditional postgraduate master's degree, e.g. Master in Science (MSci) and Master in Arts (MArts). This form is also sometimes used with other integrated master's degrees and occasionally for postgraduate master's degrees (e.g. Master's in Accounting). Some universities use Latin degree names; because of the flexibility of syntax in Latin, the Master of Arts and Master of Science degrees may be known in these institutions as Magister artium and Magister scientiæ or reversed from the English order to Artium magister and Scientiæ magister. Examples of the reversed usage include Harvard University and the University of Chicago, leading to the abbreviations AM and SM for these degrees. The forms "Master of Science" and "Master in Science" are indistinguishable in Latin.

In the UK, full stops (periods) are not commonly used in degree abbreviations. In the US, The Gregg Reference Manual recommends placing periods in degrees (e.g. B.S., Ph.D.), while The Chicago Manual of Style recommends writing degrees without periods (e.g. BS, PhD).

Master of Science is generally abbreviated MS in countries following United States usage and MSc in countries following British usage, where MS would refer to the degree of Master of Surgery. In Australia, some extended master's degrees use the title "doctor": Juris Doctor and Doctors of Medical Practice, Physiotherapy, Dentistry, Optometry, and Veterinary Practice. Despite their titles these are still master's degree and may not be referred to as doctoral degrees, nor may graduates use the title "doctor".

=== Types ===
- Postgraduate/graduate master's degrees (MA/AM, MPhil, MSc/MS/SM, MBA, LLM, MAsc, etc.) are the traditional formal form of master's degree, where the student already holds an undergraduate (bachelor's) degree on entry. Courses normally last one year in the UK and two years in the US.
- Integrated master's degrees (MChem, MEng, MMath, MPharm, MPhys, MPsych, MSci, etc.) are UK degrees that combine an undergraduate bachelor's degree course with an extra year at master's level (i.e. a total of four years in England, Wales, and Northern Ireland, and five years in Scotland). A 2011 survey of UK Higher Education Institutes found that 64% offered integrated master's course, mostly in STEM disciplines, with the most common degrees being MEng, MSci and MChem. 82% of respondents conferred only a master's degree for the course, while 9% conferred a bachelor's degree at the end of the bachelor's-level stage and a master's degree at the end of the course and a further 9% conferred both bachelor's and master's degrees at the end of the course.
- Non-master's level master's degrees: The ancient universities of the UK and Ireland have traditionally awarded MAs in a different manner to that usual today. The Scottish MA is a bachelor's-level qualification offered by the four ancient universities of Scotland. The Oxbridge MA is not an academic qualification; it is granted without further examination to those who have gained a BA from Oxford or Cambridge Universities in England, and the MA of Trinity College Dublin in Ireland is granted to its graduates in a similar manner.

The UK Quality Assurance Agency defines three categories of master's degrees:

- Research master's degrees are primarily research based, although may contain taught elements, particularly on research methods. Examples are the MLitt (usually, but not always a research degree), the Master's by Research, and the MPhil. The Master's by Research (MbyRes, ResM), which is a research degree, is distinct from the Master of Research (MRes), which is a taught degree concentrating on research methods.
- Specialised or advanced study master's degrees are primarily taught degrees, although commonly at least a third of the course is devoted to a research project assessed by dissertation. These may be stand-alone master's courses, leading to, e.g., MSc, MA or MRes degrees, or integrated master's degrees.
- Professional or practice master's degrees (see also professional degree) are designed to prepare students for a particular professional career and are primarily taught, although they may include work placements and independent study projects. Some may require professional experience for entry. Examples include MBA, MDiv, LLM, and MSW as well as some integrated master's degrees. The name of the degree normally includes the subject name.

The United States Department of Education classifies master's degrees as research or professional. Research master's degrees in the US (e.g., MA/AM or MS) require the completion of taught courses and examinations in a major and one or more minor subjects, as well as (normally) a research thesis. Professional master's degrees may be structured like research master's (e.g., ME/MEng) or may concentrate on a specific discipline (e.g., MBA) and often substitute a project for the thesis.

The Australian Qualifications Framework classifies master's degrees as research, coursework, or extended. Research master's degrees typically take one to two years, and at least two-thirds of their content consists of research, research training and independent study. Coursework master's degrees typically also last one to two years, and consist mainly of structured learning with some independent research and project work or practice-related learning. Extended master's degrees typically take three to four years and contain significant practice-related learning that must be developed in collaboration with relevant professional, statutory or regulatory bodies.

In Ireland, master's degrees are National Framework of Qualifications Level 9 major awards. There are two types: taught master's degrees and research master's degrees. Taught master's degrees are awarded following completion of an accredited programme of one to two years' duration, normally carrying 60–120 ECTS credits. Research master's degree programmes are typically two years in duration, although they are not always credit rated.

== Structure ==
There is a range of pathways to the degree with entry based on evidence of a capacity to undertake higher level studies in a proposed field. A dissertation may or may not be required depending on the program. In general, structure and duration of a program of study leading to a master's degree will differ by country and university.

=== Duration ===
Master's programs in the US and Canada are normally two years (full-time) in length. In some fields/programs, work on a doctorate begins immediately after the bachelor's degree, but a master's degree may be granted along the way as an intermediate qualification if the student petitions for it. Some universities offer evening options so that students can work during the day and earn a master's degree in the evenings.

In the UK, postgraduate master's degrees typically take one to two years full-time or two to four years part-time. Master's degrees may be classified as either "research" or "taught", with taught degrees (those where research makes up less than half of the volume of work) being further subdivided into "specialist or advanced study" or "professional or practice". Taught degrees (of both forms) typically take a full calendar year (180 UK credits, compared to 120 for an academic year), while research degrees are not typically credit rated but may take up to two years to complete. An MPhil normally takes two calendar years (360 credits). An integrated master's degree (which is always a taught degree) combines a bachelor's degree course with an additional year of study (120 credits) at master's level for a four (England, Wales and Northern Ireland) or five (Scotland) academic year total period.

In Australia, master's degrees vary from one year for a "research" or "coursework" master's following on from an Australian honours degree in a related field, with an extra six months if following on straight from an ordinary bachelor's degree and another extra six months if following on from a degree in a different field, to four years for an "extended" master's degree. At some Australian universities, the master's degree may take up to two years.

In the Overarching Framework of Qualifications for the European Higher Education Area defined as part of the Bologna process, a "second cycle" (i.e. master's degree) programme is typically 90–120 ECTS credits, with a minimum requirement of at least 60 ECTS credits at second-cycle level. The definition of ECTS credits is that "60 ECTS credits are allocated to the learning outcomes and associated workload of a full-time academic year or its equivalent", thus European master's degrees should last for between one calendar year and two academic years, with at least one academic year of study at master's level. The Framework for Higher Education Qualification (FHEQ) in England Wales and Northern Ireland level 7 qualifications and the Framework for Qualification of Higher Education Institutes in Scotland (FQHEIS) level 11 qualifications (postgraduate and integrated master's degrees, except for MAs from the ancient universities of Scotland and Oxbridge MAs) have been certified as meeting this requirement.

Irish taught master's degrees are normally one to two years in duration and carry 60–120 ECTS credits. Research master's degrees are typically two years in duration and are not always credit rated. Irish master's degrees are compatible with the second cycle of the Framework for Qualifications of the European Higher Education Area.

=== Admission ===
Admission to a master's degree normally requires successful completion of study at bachelor's degree level either (for postgraduate degrees) as a stand-alone degree or (for integrated degrees) as part of an integrated scheme of study. In countries where the bachelor's degree with honours is the standard undergraduate degree, this is often the normal entry qualification. In addition, students will normally have to write a personal statement and, in the arts and humanities, will often have to submit a portfolio of work.

In the UK, students will normally need to have a 2:1. Students may also have to provide evidence of their ability to successfully pursue a postgraduate degree to be accepted into a taught master's course, and possibly higher for a research master's. Graduate schools in the US similarly require strong undergraduate performance, and may require students to take one or more standardised tests, such as the GRE, GMAT or LSAT.

== Comparable European degrees ==
In some European countries, a magister is a first degree and may be considered equivalent to a modern (standardized) master's degree (e.g., the German, Austrian, and Polish university Diplom/Magister, or the similar five-year Diploma awarded in several subjects in Greek, Spanish, Portuguese, and other universities and polytechnics).

Under the Bologna Process, countries in the European Higher Education Area (EHEA) are moving to a three-cycle (bachelor's - master's - doctorate) system of degrees. Two-thirds of EHEA countries have standardised on 120 ECTS credits for their second-cycle (master's) degrees, but 90 ECTS credits is the main form in Cyprus, Ireland and Scotland and 60-75 credits in Montenegro, Serbia and Spain. The combined length of the first and second cycle varies from "3 + 1" years (240 ECTS credits), through "3 + 2" or "4 + 1" years (300 ECTS credits), to "4 + 2" years (360 ECTS credits). As of 2015, 31 EHEA countries have integrated programmes that combine the first and second cycle and lead to a second-cycle qualification (e.g. the UK integrated master's degree), particularly in STEM subjects and subjects allied to medicine. These typically have a duration of 300 – 360 ECTS credits (five to six years), with the integrated master's degrees in England, Wales and Northern Ireland being the shortest at 240 ECTS credits (four years).

- In Denmark, there are two forms of master's degree. The Master's Degree or candidatus is a FQ-EHEA second-cycle qualification worth 120 ECTS credits. These degrees are research-based and offered through universities (e.g. University of Copenhagen and Copenhagen Business School). The second form is the Master Degree (no possessive) within the adult continuing education system, which is worth 60 ECTS credits and is taught part-time. The candidatus degree is abbreviated cand. and upon completion of, for instance, an engineering master's degree, a person becomes cand.polyt. (polytechnical). Similar abbreviations, inspired by Latin, apply to a large number of fields, e.g.: sociology (cand.scient.soc), economics (cand.merc., cand.polit. or cand.oecon), law (cand.jur), humanities (cand.mag) etc. Use of a cand. title requires a master's degree. Holders of a cand. degree are also entitled to use MSc or MA titles, depending on the field of study. In Finland and Sweden, the title of kandidaatti/kandidat (abbreviated kand.) equates to a bachelor's degree.
- In France, the master's degree (diplôme de master) takes two years and is worth 120 ECTS credits. The two years are often called the master 1 (M1) and master 2 (M2), following the Bologna Process. Depending on the goal of the student (a doctorate or a professional career) the master can also be called a "Master Recherche" (research master) or a "Master Professionnel" (professional master), each with different requirements.
  A French diplôme d'ingénieur (postgraduate degree in engineering of grandes écoles) is also the equivalent of a master's degree, provided the diploma is recognised by the Commission des titres d'ingénieur, as are qualifications recognised at Level 7 of the répertoire national des certifications professionnelles (national register of professional certificates).
- In Italy, the master's degree is equivalent to the two-year Laurea magistrale, which can be earned after a Laurea (a three-year undergraduate degree, equivalent to a bachelor's degree). In particular fields, namely law, pharmacy and medicine, this distinction is not made. University courses are therefore single and last five to six years, after which the master's degree is awarded (in this case referred to as Laurea magistrale a ciclo unico). The old Laurea degree (Vecchio Ordinamento, Old Regulations), which was the only awarded in Italy before the Bologna process, is equivalent to the current Laurea Magistrale.
- In the Netherlands, the titles ingenieur (ir.), meester (mr.) and doctorandus (drs.) may be rendered, if obtained in the Netherlands from a university, after the application of the Bologna process, as: MSc instead of ir., LLM instead of mr. and MA or MSc instead of drs. This is because a single program that led to these degree was in effect before 2002, which comprised the same course load as the bachelor and master programs put together. Those who had already started the program could, upon completing it, bear the appropriate title (MSc, LLM or MA), but alternatively still use the old-style title (ir., mr. or drs.), corresponding to their field of study. Since these graduates do not have a separate bachelor's degree (which is – in retrospect – incorporated into the program), the master's degree is their first academic degree. Bearers of foreign master's degree can use the titles ir., mr. and drs. only after obtaining a permission to bear such titles from the Dienst Uitvoering Onderwijs. Those who received their mr., ir. or drs. title after the application of the Bologna process have the option of signing as A. Jansen, MA or A. Jansen, MSc, depending on the field in which the degree was obtained, since the ir., mr. and drs. titles are similar to a master's degree, and the shortcut MA or MSc may officially be used in order to render such title as an international title.
- In Belgium, the higher education system is governed by the communities and have separately implemented the Bologna Process. In Flanders, a master's degree can be obtained when completing a two-year study at university (120 ECTS), although there also exist some master's studies which only require 1 year of education (60 ECTS). This discrepancy has various reasons, but the main cause is the transition from the pre-Bologna Process degrees. Degrees like industrial engineering were previously not obtained through university and only took one year, but got transferred to universities, hence why the master's degree for industrial engineering only takes one year at university currently. Similar situations arose for other one-year degrees obtained before 2013 and are therefore now converted to master's degrees through a special certificate. Other master's degrees, such as the degrees from the faculty of Arts and Literature are historically only one year, just like they were before the Bologna Process ratification. Master's degrees for medicine take 3 years to be completed. The situation for the French Community of Belgium is similar in many ways, but has implemented it differently.
- In Switzerland, the old Licence or Diplom (4 to 5 years in duration) is considered equivalent to the master's degree.
- In Slovenia and Croatia, during the pre-Bologna process education, all academic degrees were awarded after a minimum of four years of university studies and a successful defence of a written thesis and are considered equivalent to the master's degree. After the completion of that first cycle of the pre-Bologna higher education, the students obtained professional degrees with the titles of Professor (abbreviation "prof.") for educational studies, Engineer (abbreviation "ing.") for technical studies, or Licensed professional of their field of expertise (abbreviation "dipl." with a reference to the profession) for other studies. The title of Magister Scientiae (abbreviation "mr. sc.") was awarded to students who completed a postgraduate university programme (and therefore qualified for a doctorate programme), while the title of Scientiae Doctor (abbreviation "dr. sc.") was awarded to students who completed a postgraduate doctoral programme. Slovenia is a full member of the Bologna Process since 1999 and Croatia since 2001.
- In the Baltic states, there is a two-year education program that offers a chance to gain a master's degree in interdisciplinary issues. The system offers an education in different areas, such as humanities, environmental and social issues, whilst paying specific consideration to the Baltic Sea area. It is a joint-degree program, which is part of a team effort with four universities. There is for example the University of Tartu in Estonia, Vytautas Magnus University in Lithuania and the University of Latvia. The educational programmes allow students to be mobile within the system, for example one semester may be taken in a confederate school without paying additional membership or tuition fees. Subsequently, after passing the qualifications provided, people may procure teaching qualifications and continue their scholastic research around doctoral studies, or carry on studying within their career in the private or public sector. Graduates of the program, within the Baltic Sea area are also given the chance to continue onwards with their studies within the postgraduate system if they have studied the social sciences or humanities field.
- In Greece, the metaptychiako (μεταπτυχιακό) which literally translates as post-degree (...programme or title), lasts normally from one to, more often, two years, and can be studied after a, at least, four-years undergraduate ptychio, which means degree.
  Also, the five-year diploma (δίπλωμα) awarded in all Polytechnics (schools of engineering) and the Athens School of Fine Arts is considered equal to a graduate degree plus a master's degree.
- In Ireland, master's degrees are NFQ Level 9 qualifications and correspond to the second cycle of the Bologna Process. They may be taught or research-based. Taught master's degrees normally last one to two years and carry 60–120 ECTS credits, while research master's degrees are typically two years in duration and may not be credit rated.
- In Russia, a master (магистр) degree can be obtained after a two-year master course (магистратура) which is available after a four-year bachelor or a five-year specialist course. A graduate may choose a master course completely different from his/her previous one. During these two years master students attend specialized lectures in chosen profile, choose a faculty advisor and prepare their master thesis which is eventually defended before certifying commission consisting mostly of professors, leading by the professor from another university.
- In the United Kingdom, first degrees in medicine, dentistry, and veterinary science are considered equivalent to master's degrees despite, for historical reasons, often having the titles of bachelor's degrees.
- The old Spanish degrees of Licenciado (Licenciate), Arquitecto (Architect) and Ingeniero (Engineer) are also equivalent to master's degrees. They were integrated programmes of study that combined first and second cycles and led to a second cycle qualification. The Spanish government issued a royal decree in 2014 establishing the official equivalences between the Spanish pre-Bologna degrees and the European Qualifications Framework (EQF) levels. Most (if not all) Licenciado, Arquitecto and Ingeniero degrees were placed in level 7 (Master) of the EQF. These programmes have been phased out and replaced with the new Bologna programmes of Máster, to be completed after completion of a programme of Grado (Bachelor's).

=== Nomenclature ===
In Spain and Latin America, the Master's degree nomenclature in the Spanish language varies from one country to another. It is known as:

- Maestría: in Argentina, Bolivia, Colombia, Costa Rica, Ecuador, El Salvador, Guatemala, Honduras, Mexico, Nicaragua, Panama, Peru, Puerto Rico, Uruguay, and the Dominican Republic.
- Máster: in Spain, Guatemala, and Paraguay. Magíster (abbreviated Mag.): in Chile, Colombia, Uruguay, and Peru.
- Magister Scientiae (abbreviated MSc.): in Venezuela and Peru. The term magíster is used to refer to someone who has received the corresponding degree.

Note: In Argentina, Colombia, Chile, Ecuador, and Uruguay, the term "magíster" is used to refer to a person who has completed a master's degree and received the corresponding title.

== Brazil ==
After acquiring a Bachelor's, Technologist or Licenciate Degree, students are qualified to continue their academic career through Master's Degree ("mestrado", in Portuguese, a.k.a. stricto sensu post-graduation) or Specialization Degree ("especialização", in Portuguese, a.k.a. lato sensu post-graduation) programs. At the Master's program there are 2–3 years of graduate-level studies. Usually focused on academic research, the Master's Degree requires, on any specific knowledge area, the development of a thesis to be presented and defended before a board of professors after the period of research. Conversely, the Specialization Degree, also comprehends a 1–2 years studies, but does not require a new thesis to be proposed and defended, being usually attended by professionals looking for complementary training on a specific area of their knowledge.

In addition, many Brazilian universities offer an MBA program. However, those are not the equivalent to a United States MBA degree, as it does not formally certify the student with a Master's degree (stricto sensu) but with a Specialization Degree (lato sensu) instead. A regular post-graduation course has to comply with a minimum of 360 class-hours, while an MBA degree has to comply with a minimum of 400 class-hours. Master's degree (stricto sensu) does not require a set minimum of class-hours, but it is practically impossible to finish it in less than 18 months due to the workload and research required; an average time for the degree is 2.5 years. Specialization (lato sensu) and MBA degrees can be also offered as distance education courses, while the master's degree (stricto-sensu) requires physical attendance. In Brazil, the degree often serves as additional qualification for those seeking to differentiate themselves in the job market, or for those who want to pursue a PhD It corresponds to the European (Bologna Process) 2nd Cycle or the North American master's.

== Asia ==
=== Hong Kong ===
Hong Kong requires one or two years of full-time coursework to achieve a master's degree. For part-time study, two or three years of study are normally required to achieve a postgraduate degree.

As in the United Kingdom, the MPhil is the most advanced master's degree and usually includes both a taught portion and a research portion which requires candidates to complete an extensive original research for their thesis. Regardless of subject, students in all faculties (including sciences, arts, humanities and social sciences) may be awarded the Master of Philosophy.

=== Pakistan ===
In Pakistani education system, there are two different master's degree programmes. Master’s degrees are earned after having received a bachelor’s pass degree and one year after the honours degree. The master's program generally lasts for two years.

- 2 years master's programmes: these are mostly Master of Arts (MA) leading to MPhil/PhM
- 4 years master's programmes: these are mostly Master of Science (MS) leading to PhD

Both MA and MS are offered in all major subjects.

=== India ===
In the Indian system, a master's degree is a postgraduate degree following a Bachelor's degree and preceding a Doctorate, usually requiring two years to complete. The available degrees include but are not limited to the following:

- Master of Arts (MA)
- Master of Social Work (MSW)
- Master of Business Administration (MBA)
- Master of Engineering (MEng/ME)
- Master of Philosophy (MPhil)
- Master of Science (MSc)
- Master of Technology (MTech)
- Master of Statistics (MStat)
- Master of Laws (LLM)
- Master of Commerce (MCom)
- Master of Architecture (MArch)
- Master of Veterinary Science (MVSc)

=== Indonesia ===
In the Indonesian higher education system, a master's degree (Indonesian: magister) is a postgraduate degree following a bachelor's degree, preceding a doctorate and requiring a maximum of four years to complete. Master's degree students are required to submit their thesis (Indonesian: tesis) for examination by two or three examiners. The available degrees include but are not limited to the following:

- Magister Administrasi Bisnis (MAB) (Master of Business Administration)
- Magister Manajemen (MM) (Master of Management)
- Magister Sains (MSi) (Master of Science)
- Magister Teknik (MT) (Master of Engineering)
- Magister Hukum (MH) (Master of Laws)
- Magister Pendidikan (MPd) (Master of Education)
- Magister Olahraga (MOr) (Master of Sport Science)

=== Israel ===
Postgraduate studies in Israel require the completion of a bachelor's degree and is dependent upon this title's grades; see Education in Israel#Higher education. Degrees awarded are the MA, MSc, MBA, and LLM; the Technion awards a non-thesis MEng. There also exists "a direct track" doctorate degree, which lasts four to five years. Taking this route, students prepare a preliminary research paper during their first year, after which they must pass an exam before being allowed to proceed, at which point they are awarded a master's degree.

=== Nepal ===
In Nepal, after completing a bachelor's degree, students must spend at least three or four years studying full-time in college and university, with an entrance test for those who wish to pursue master's, PhD, and doctorate degrees. All doctoral and PhD degrees, as well as third cycle degrees, are research and experience oriented, with a focus on results.

After completing a successful bachelor's degree, students pursue master's degrees in engineering, education, and arts, as well as all law and medicine-related courses.

MBBS is only a medical degree with six and a half years of study resulting in a medical doctor and must finish its study in four years after master's degree with minimum education of 15 or 16 years of university bachelor's degree education.

The following are the most professional and internationalized programs in Nepal:

- Master of Business Administration (MBA)
- Master of Computer Applications (MCA)
- Master of Engineering (MEng)
- Master of Science (MSc)
- Master of Science in Information Technology (MScIT)
- Master of Business Studies (MBS)
- Master of Education (MEd)
- Master of Arts (MA)
- Master of Science in Agriculture (MScAg)
- Master of Laws (LLM)
- Master of Management (MM)

=== Taiwan ===
In Taiwan, bachelor's degree courses are about four years in length, while an entrance examination is required for people who want to study for master's degrees and doctorates. The courses leading to these higher degrees are normally research-based.

Tuition is less expensive than would be the case in North America, costing as little as US$5000 for an MBA. As an incentive designed to increase foreign student numbers, the government and universities of Taiwan have redoubled their efforts to make a range of high-quality scholarships available in the form of university-specific scholarships that include tuition waivers of up to NT$20,000 per month. The government offers the Taiwan Scholarship amounting to NT$20,000–30,000 per month (US$654–981) for a two-year program.

== See also ==
- Associate's degree
- Bachelor's degree
- British degree abbreviations
- Diploma mill
- Doctorate
- Educational specialist
- Engineer's degree
- Euromaster
- European Joint Master degree in Economics
- Graduate school
- Licentiate
- List of master's degrees
- Magister (degree)
- Master of Advanced Studies
- Master of Arts
- Master of Arts (Oxbridge and Dublin)
- Master of Arts (Scotland)
- Master of Education
- Master of Engineering
- Master of Laws
- Master of Science
- Master's degree in Europe
- Master's degree in North America
- Master's degree non-Euroamerican
- Postgraduate-only institutions
- Professional Science Master's degree
- Terminal degree
