= Divinity (academic discipline) =

Study of Christian theology and ministry

Divinity is the study of Christian theology and ministry at a school, divinity school, university, or seminary. The term is sometimes a synonym for theology as an academic, speculative pursuit, and sometimes is used for the study of applied theology and ministry to make a distinction between that and academic theology.

While it most often refers to Christian study which is linked with the professional degrees for ordained ministry or related work, it is also used in an academic setting by other faith traditions. For example, in many traditional British public schools and universities, the term is often used in place of religious studies, which deals with religion more broadly, to describe classes that include theology and philosophy in the context of religion as a whole, rather than just the Christian tradition.

== Areas and specializations ==
Divinity can be divided into several distinct but related disciplines. These vary, sometimes widely, from church to church and from one faith tradition to another, and even among various programs within a particular church. For example, Scottish divinity programs are traditionally divided between biblical and theological studies.

A typical divinity program will include many of the following:

=== Philosophical theology ===
- Systematic theology
- Dogmatic theology
- Moral theology or Christian ethics
- Natural theology
- Sacramental theology

=== Practice of worship ===
- Liturgics
- Homiletics
- Sacred music

=== Ministry in the field ===
- Pastoral theology
- Pastoral counseling
- Religious education techniques

=== Scriptural study and languages ===
- Biblical studies or Sacred Scripture
- Biblical Hebrew
- New Testament Greek
- Latin
- Old Church Slavonic

=== Miscellany ===
- Canon law
- Church history
- Ecclesiology

== Degrees ==
Studying divinity usually leads to the awarding of an academic degree or a professional degree. Such degrees, particularly in modern times the Master of Divinity, are prerequisites for ordained ministry in most Christian denominations and many other faith communities. The exception to this is all "plain" churches such as the Amish, Old German Baptist Brethren, Old Order Mennonite, Dunkard Brethren, and many others. In fact, such churches hold to the belief that seminaries are an institution of man and not supported by Holy Scripture. Students earn such degrees at a free-standing seminary, theologate or divinity school, or at a university.

The Master of Divinity (M.Div.) is the most common degree taken before ordained ministry in North America.

=== List of degrees ===
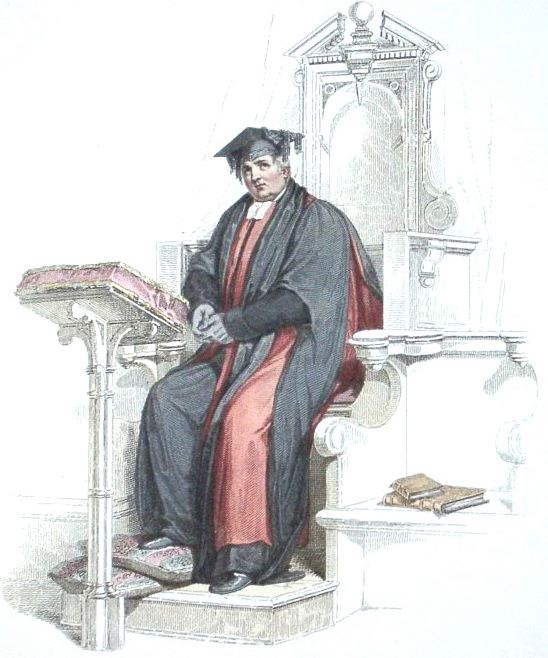
Aquatint of a Doctor of Divinity at the University of Oxford, in the scarlet and black academic robes corresponding to his position. (The Doctor appears here in his Convocation habit, rather than his full ceremonial dress.) From Rudolph Ackermann's History of Oxford, 1814.

The following is a list of most of the common degrees in divinity:

- Bachelor of Arts in Theology (B.A. or A.B.)
- Bachelor of Canon Law (J.C.B.; B.L.C.)
- Bachelor of Divinity (B.D.; B.Div.)
- Bachelor of Hebrew Letters (B.H.L.)
- Bachelor of Ministry (B.Min.)
- Bachelor of Religious Education (B.R.E.)
- Bachelor of Sacred Literature (B.S.Litt.)
- Bachelor of Sacred Music (B.Mus. or S.M.B.)
- Bachelor of Sacred Scripture (S.S.B.)
- Bachelor of Sacred Theology (S.T.B.)
- Bachelor of the History and Cultural Patrimony of the Church
- Bachelor of Theology (B.Th.)
- Lector of Sacred Scripture (S.S.Lect.)
- Lector of Sacred Theology (S.T.Lect.)
- Licentiate of Canon Law (J.C.L.)
- Licentiate of Sacred Music (S.M.L.)
- Licentiate of Sacred Scripture (S.S.L.)
- Licentiate of Sacred Theology (S.T.L.)
- Licentiate of the Cultural Patrimony of the Church
- Licentiate of the History of the Church
- Licentiate of Theology (L.Th.)
- Master of Arts in Theology (M.A. or A.M.)
- Master of the Cultural Patrimony of the Church
- Master of Divinity (M.Div.)
- Master of Ministry (M.Min.)
- Master of Philosophy with a specialization in Theology (M.Phil)
- Master of Religious Arts (M.R.A.)
- Master of Religious Education (M.R.E.)
- Master of Sacred Literature (M.S.Litt.)
- Master of Sacred Music (M.Mus. or M.S.M.)
- Master of Sacred Theology (S.T.M.)
- Master of Theological Studies (M.T.S.)
- Master of Theology (M.Th., Th.M., M.S.T., or M.Theol.)
- Master of Worship Studies (M.W.S.)
- Doctor of Canon and Civil Laws (J.U.D.; I.U.D.; D.U.J.; J.U.Dr.; D.U.I.; D.J.U.; Dr.iur.utr.; Dr.jur.utr.; D.I.U.; U.J.D.; U.I.D.)
- Doctor of Canon Law (J.C.D.; I.C.D.; D.C.L.; dr.iur.can.; D.Cnl.; D.D.C.; D.Can.L.)
- Doctor of the Cultural Patrimony of the Church
- Doctor of Divinity (D.D.)
- Doctor of the History of the Church
- Doctor of Ministry (D.Min.)
- Doctor of Missiology (D.Miss.)
- Doctor of Philosophy in Theology (Ph.D.)
- Doctor of Practical Theology (D.P.T., D.Th.P.)
- Doctor of Sacred Literature (D.S.Litt.)
- Doctor of Sacred Music (D.M.A., D.S.M., S.M.D.)
- Doctor of Sacred Scripture (S.S.D.)
- Doctor of Sacred Theology (S.T.D.)
- Doctor of Theology (Th.D., Dr. Theol., D.Theol.)
- Doctor of Worship Studies (D.W.S.)

== See also ==
- Doctorate
- Licentiate
- Postdoctoral research
