= Patricio Cuevas-Parra =

Dr Patricio Cuevas-Parra is a children's rights advocate who manages research and information analysis on social justice issues affecting children and young people. He has published a variety of books and reports on the topics of children's rights, child participation, indigenous children and gender equality. He holds a PhD in Social Policy from the University of Edinburgh, United Kingdom, a Master of Advanced Studies in Children’s Rights from University of Fribourg-UIKB, Switzerland, and a Master of International Relations.

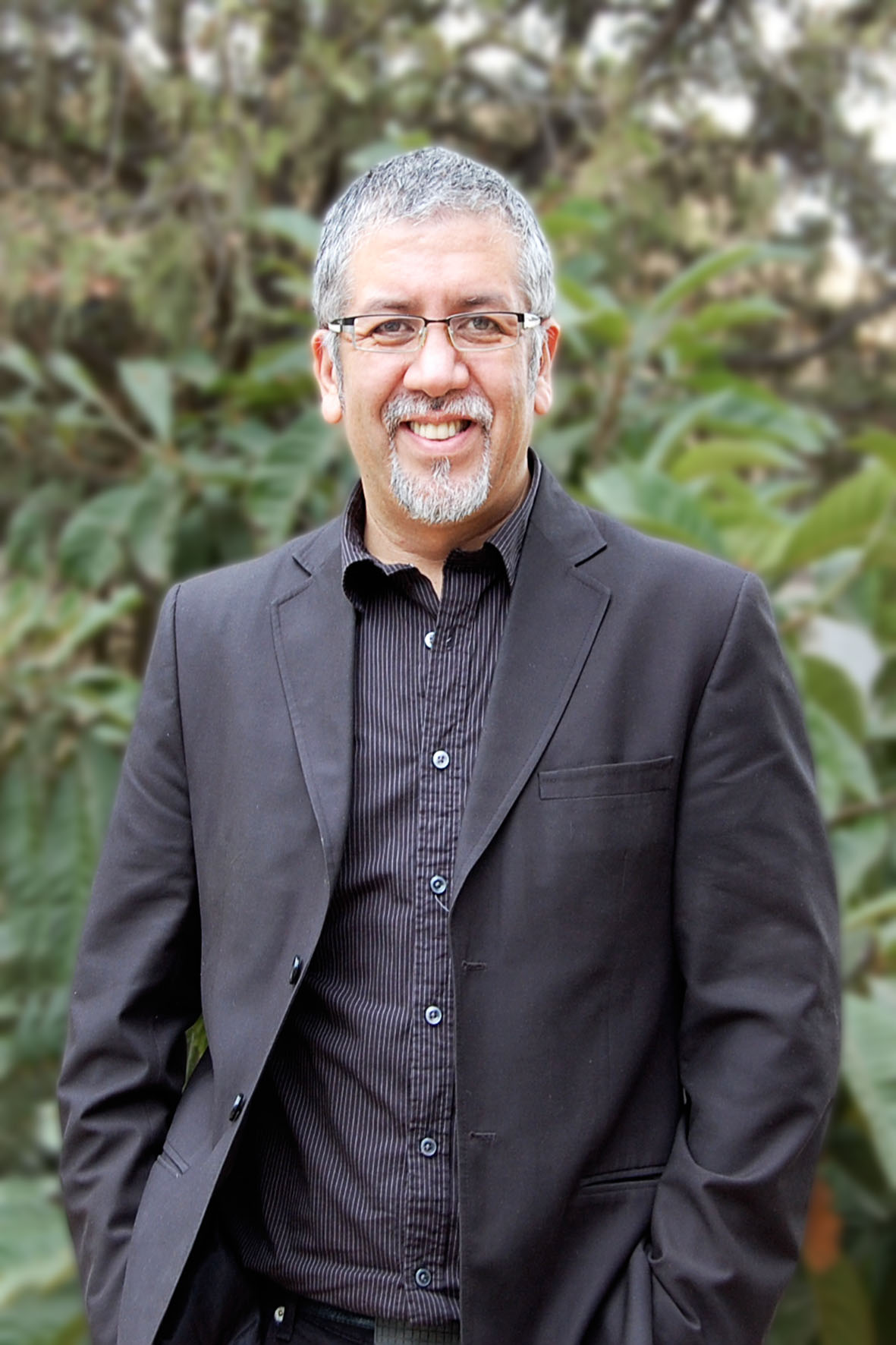
Dr Patricio Cuevas-Parra

== Biography ==
Dr Patricio Cuevas-Parra was born in Chile. He holds a PhD in Social Policy from the University of Edinburgh, United Kingdom, a Master of Advanced Studies in Children's Rights from the University of Fribourg-UIKB, Switzerland, and a Master of International Relations. Patricio has worked in more than 20 countries, including long-term roles in Ecuador, Chile, Indonesia, Lebanon, Cyprus and the United Kingdom. At present, he is the Senior Global Policy Adviser for Child Participation and Rights with World Vision International where he leads strategies and programmes to ensure that children and young people are at the centre of the advocacy process and policy debate. Mr Cuevas-Parra manages research and information analysis on social justice issues affecting children and young people and assesses relevant national laws and regulations in light of international frameworks and instruments. He then translates his findings into social programmes and policies to improve the quality of life of children in developing countries. Within this area, much of the focus of his work has been to increase public awareness of the problems that affect children and young people, such as discrimination, social exclusion, injustice, violence and inequality. As part of his role, he has advised, designed and implemented advocacy and peace-building strategies focused on promoting the participation of the poorest and most excluded and discriminated against populations to influence social justice and public policy changes in multi-religious and conflict-prone contexts. His work, in particular, how to ethically and meaningfully engage children and young people in research, draws from the intensive specialist training he undertook as part of his Childhood Studies at the University of Edinburgh. Dr Cuevas-Parra also has a strong base in Social Policy from his studies at the School of Social and Political Science, University of Edinburgh, supported by the Centre for Research on Families and Relationships (CRFR).

Mr Cuevas-Parra has published widely on children and human rights related subjects, most notably on child participation, empowerment, voice, citizenship and gender equality. In particular, his publications include studies on the situation of women in Aceh, Indonesia after the 2004 Asia tsunami, the state of children's rights in Lebanon 20 years after the adoption of the Convention on the Rights of the Child, and child participation manuals for practitioners. His latest publication is titled Child-Led Research: Questioning knowledge and co-authored with Professor Kay Tisdall from the University of Edinburgh.

Mr Cuevas-Parra has a keen interest in looking at cutting-edge child rights advocacy tools and models to enhance children and young people's engagement in decision-making. He facilitated the engagement of 35 children to produce an unprecedented child-led alternative report on child rights issues that was submitted to the United Nations Human Rights Universal Periodic Review, in 2010. Patricio also led participatory processes where children were given spaces to write books about their personal stories based on the principles outlined in Article 12 of the Convention on the Rights of the Child. Children used these publications to influence their communities, stakeholders and government officials in order to contribute to a more just society. Furthermore, post-tsunami, he created gender-sensitive workshops for single parents in Indonesia, which aimed to empower people to embrace the idea that everybody can be a great mother or father, despite the cultural conditioning that exists in most male-dominated societies. The workshops were developed to support the position that the stability and quality of role models are more important than people's gender.

Mr Cuevas-Parra won the 2008 World Vision Award for Innovation in Advocacy for his determination and coordinated actions to end violence against children and to place children and young people at the forefront of advocacy and child protection efforts. He was also awarded funding from the Ministry General Secretariat of Government of Chile to lead a study on children's perceptions of their rights. Later, he was awarded more funding by the Government of Chile to explore the views of indigenous children.

== Research ==
Cuevas-Parra's research interests focus on understanding children and young people's lives. He has a particular interest in exploring innovative and participatory methodologies to engage children and young people in decision-making processes. His research falls into four main categories:

- children and young people's perspectives on violence and abuse
- children's rights and participation in public policy and decision-making
- child-led research: methodologies and impact
- children and young people's identities and inequalities

=== Selected research projects ===
- ‘Child activists for ending child marriage: Exploring children’s experiences in Bangladesh’ (2018–19) with Kay Tisdall (University of Edinburgh)
- ‘Children advocating for their children’s rights: A study from the Children’s Council in Lebanon’ (2013-2014)
- ‘What do children think? Children’s views on being cared for, being protected and participating’ (2009-2010)
- ‘The child’s right to be heard in the UN Human Rights system: A case study from Lebanon’ (2009) - action research with children and young people from Lebanon

== Bibliography ==
- Cuevas-Parra, Patricio. (2025) “Children’s Participation in the Context of Inequalities: Confronting Children’s Agency, Social Positioning, and Power Disparity”, “Studies in Childhood and Youth”, Springer Nature Switzerland https://link.springer.com/book/10.1007/978-3-031-76973-3
- Cuevas-Parra, P. (2024) "Exercising agency on the periphery: Brazilian children and young people’s understanding of agency and choice within contexts of inequality", in Young People in the Global South: Voice, Agency and Citizenship, Routledge
- Cuevas-Parra, P. and Tisdall, E.K.M. (2019) Child-Led Research: Questioning knowledge, Social Sciences 8(2): 44, doi: 10.3390/socsci8020044 https://www.mdpi.com/2076-0760/8/2/44
- Cuevas-Parra, P. (2016) Becoming researchers: A simple guide for children and young people who want to carry out social research, World Vision International
- Cuevas-Parra, P. (2014) Children advocating for their children’s rights: A case study from the Children’s Council in Lebanon, World Vision International (2015)
- Just cities for children: Voices from urban slums, World Vision International
- Cuevas-Parra, P. (2010) What do children think? Children’s views on being cared for, protected and participating, World Vision International
- Cuevas-Parra, P. (2010) Children make their voices heard: Manual for practitioners, World Vision Lebanon
- Cuevas-Parra, P. (2009) Twenty years on: Children and their rights in Lebanon, World Vision Lebanon
- Cuevas-Parra, P. (2006) Still standing tall, World Vision Indonesia Tsunami Response
- Cuevas-Parra, P. (2003) Forty Chilean women, UNESCO, Ministry of Women and World Vision
- Cuevas-Parra, P. (2002) Tales and adventures: Indigenous children from Chile, UNICEF, World Vision and Ministry of General Secretariat of Chile
- Cuevas-Parra, P. (2000) Boys and girls have rights, UNICEF, World Vision and Ministry of General Secretariat of Chile
