= Quadrivium =

Liberal arts of arithmetic, geometry, music and astronomy

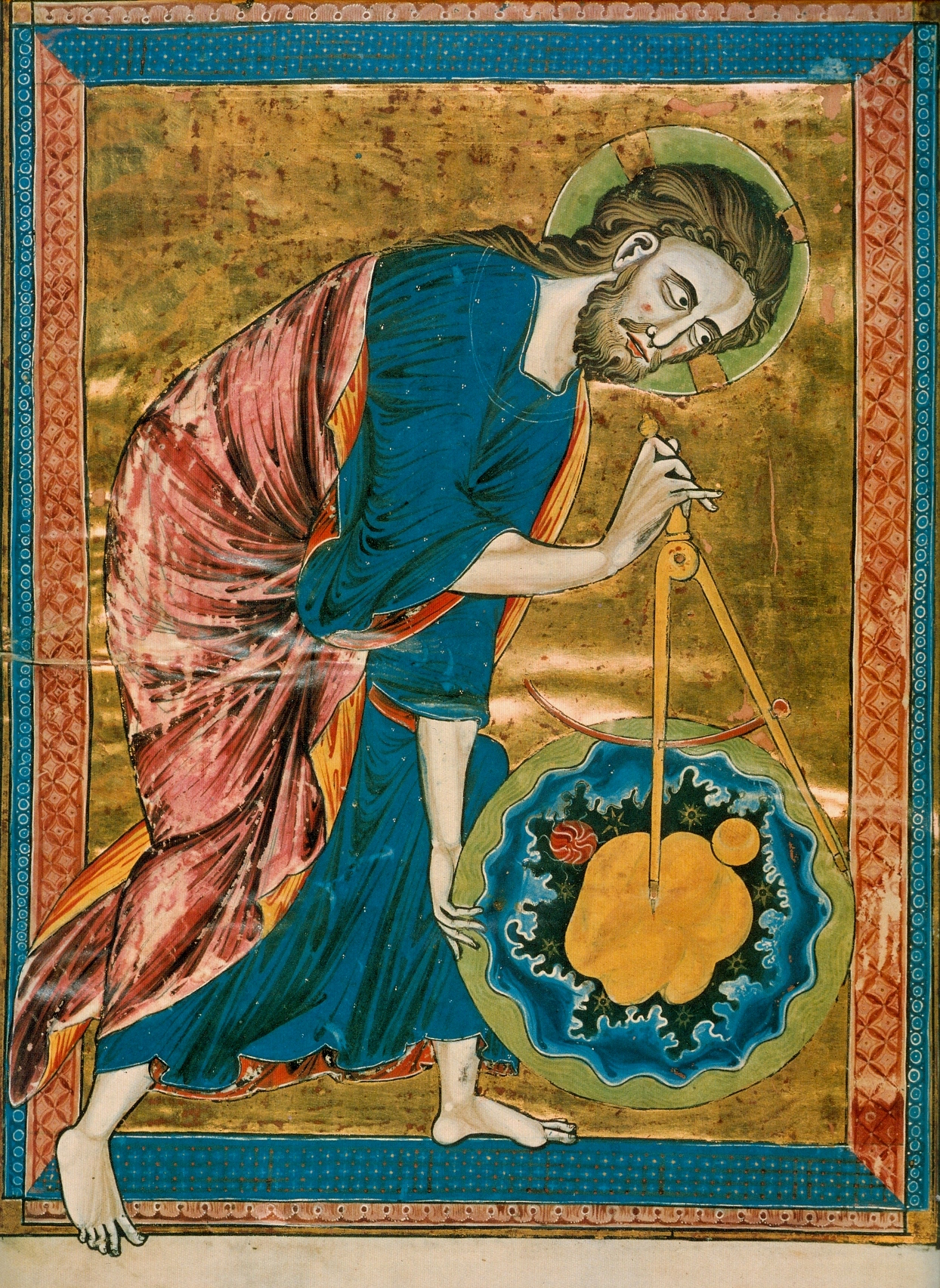
For most medieval scholars, who believed that God created the universe according to geometric and harmonic principles, science—particularly geometry and astronomy—was linked directly to the divine. To seek these principles, therefore, would be to seek God.

The quadrivium (Latin for "four ways") is a pedagogical grouping of four historical mathematical arts—arithmetic, geometry, music, and astronomy— which was first taught in classical antiquity, and later revived in medieval Europe. Together with the trivium, they make up the seven classic disciplines of the liberal arts education. Beginning with Petrarch in the 14th century, studia humanitatis and its subsequent offshoots gradually supplanted the trivium and quadrivium as curricular conventions.

== History ==
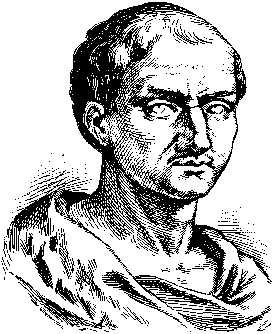
The Roman philosopher Boethius, author of The Consolation of Philosophy

The four mathematical arts compose the secondary part of the curriculum outlined by Plato in The Republic and are described in the seventh book of that work (in the order arithmetic, geometry, astronomy, music). The quadrivium is implicit in early Pythagorean writings and in the De nuptiis of Martianus Capella, although the term quadrivium was not used until Boethius, early in the sixth century. As Proclus wrote:

The Pythagoreans considered all mathematical science to be divided into four parts: one half they marked off as concerned with quantity, the other half with magnitude; and each of these they posited as twofold. A quantity can be considered in regard to its character by itself or in its relation to another quantity, magnitudes as either stationary or in motion. Arithmetic studies quantities as such, music the relations between quantities, geometry magnitude at rest, spherics [astronomy] magnitude inherently moving.

The first use of quadrivium as a term has been attributed to Boethius, when he affirmed that the height of philosophy can be attained only following "a sort of fourfold path" (quodam quasi quadruvio). It was considered the foundation for the study of philosophy (sometimes called the "liberal art par excellence") and theology.

"As Nichomachus describes, mathematics begins with what is known through the senses but proceeds to what is known only through the intellect"

== Medieval usage ==
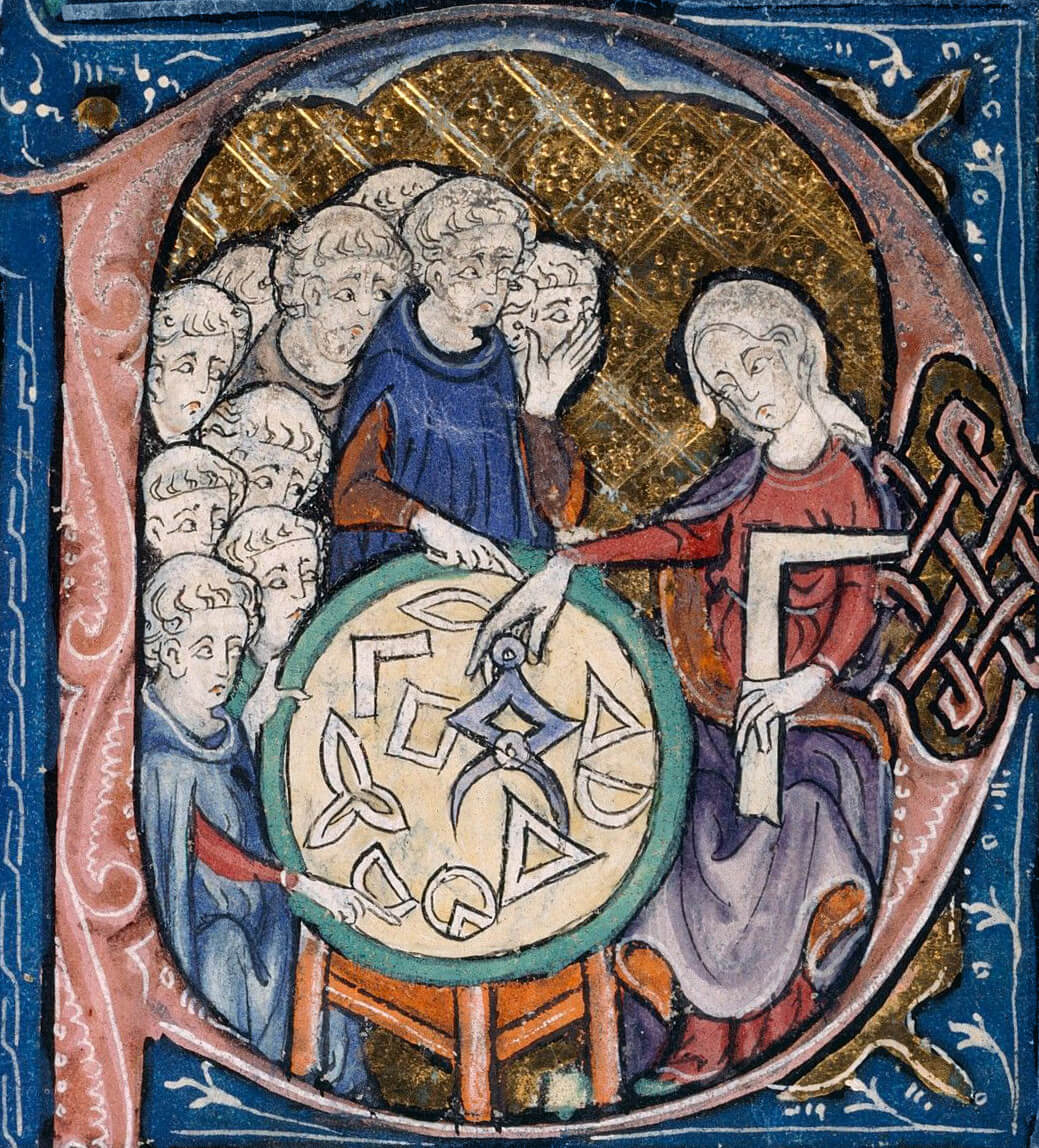
Woman Teaching How to Construct Geometric Shapes. Illustration at the beginning of a medieval translation of Euclid's Elements (c. 1310)

The medieval liberal arts curriculum began with the trivium, followed by the quadrivium. The seven liberal arts were considered "thinking skills" and were distinguished from practical arts, such as medicine and architecture. At many medieval universities, the quadrivium would have been the course leading to the degree of Master of Arts (after the BA). After the MA, the student could enter for bachelor's degrees of the higher faculties (Theology, Medicine or Law). To this day, some of the postgraduate degree courses lead to the degree of Bachelor (the B.Phil and B.Litt. degrees are examples in the field of philosophy).

Educationally, the trivium and the quadrivium imparted to the student the seven essential thinking skills of classical antiquity. Altogether the Seven Liberal Arts belonged to the so-called 'lower faculty' (of Arts), whereas Medicine, Jurisprudence (Law), and Theology were established in the three so-called 'higher' faculties. It was therefore quite common in the middle ages for lecturers in the lower trivium and/or quadrivium faculty to be students themselves in one of the higher faculties. Philosophy was typically neither a subject nor a faculty in its own right, but was rather present implicitly as an 'auxiliary tool' within the discourses of the higher faculties, especially theology; the separation of philosophy from theology and its elevation to an autonomous academic discipline were post-medieval developments. The study was eclectic, approaching the philosophical objectives sought by considering it from each aspect of the quadrivium within the general structure demonstrated by Proclus (AD 412–485), namely arithmetic and music on the one hand and geometry and cosmology on the other.

The art of music within the quadrivium was originally the classical subject of harmonics, in particular the study of the proportions between the musical intervals created by the division of a monochord. A relationship to music as actually practised was not part of this study, but the framework of classical harmonics would substantially influence the content and structure of music theory as practised in both European and Islamic cultures.

=== Decline ===
Displacement of the quadrivium by other curricular approaches from the time of Petrarch gained momentum with the subsequent Renaissance emphasis on what became the modern humanities, one of four liberal arts of the modern era, alongside natural science (where much of the actual subject matter of the original quadrivium now resides), social science, and the arts; though it may appear that music in the quadrivium would be a modern branch of performing arts, it was then an abstract system of proportions that was carefully studied at a distance from actual musical practice, and effectively a branch of music theory more tightly bound to arithmetic than to musical expression.

== Modern usage ==
In modern applications of the liberal arts as curriculum in colleges or universities, the quadrivium has been considered by many to be the study of number and its relationship to space or time: arithmetic being pure number, geometry number in space, music number in time, and astronomy number in space and time. Morris Kline classified the four elements of the quadrivium as pure (arithmetic), stationary (geometry), moving (astronomy), and applied (music) number.

The term continues to be used by the classical education movement, and explicitly at the independent Oundle School, in the United Kingdom.

== See also ==
- Andreas Capellanus
- Vedanga
- Degrees of the University of Oxford
- Four arts
- Martianus Capella
- Trivium
