= William Holford, Baron Holford =

British architect and town planner (1907–1975)

The Right Honourable The Lord Holford RA
- Elliott & Fry, 1953
- Born: 22 March 1907; Johannesburg, South Africa
- Died: 17 October 1975 (aged 68); London, England
- Occupation: Architect
- Spouse: Marjorie Brooks (m. 1933)
- Awards: Royal Gold Medal (1963)
- Buildings: Clarendon House, Oxford buildings for Eton College
- Projects: Canberra, Australia; Paternoster Square, London

William Graham Holford, Baron Holford, RA (22 March 1907 – 17 October 1975) was a British architect and town planner.

== Biography ==
Holford was educated at Diocesan College, Cape Town and returned to Johannesburg. From 1925 to 1930 he studied architecture at the University of Liverpool, where he won the British Prix de Rome in Architecture to the British School at Rome in 1930. While in Rome he met British mural painter Marjorie Brooks, who had independently won the British Prix de Rome for Painting, and married her in 1933.

Holford outwardly adopted the planning philosophies of Lewis Mumford and showed his appreciation for the architect Le Corbusier. He was appointed a lecturer at the University of Liverpool from 1933 and succeeded Patrick Abercrombie as Professor of Civic Design there in 1937. In 1948 he again succeeded Abercrombie as Professor of Town Planning at University College London. He held this post until he retired in 1970.

Holford was knighted in 1953 and on 29 January 1965 he was made a life peer as Baron Holford, of Kemp Town in the County of Sussex by the Wilson Government, the first town planner to be made a Lord.

He served as president of the Royal Town Planning Institute between 1953 and 1954. Later, Holford served as president of the Royal Institute of British Architects between 1960 and 1962.

== Works ==
Holford was heavily involved with the development of post-World War II British town planning and was largely responsible for drafting the Town and Country Planning Act 1947.

=== Cambridge – the Holford-Wright Report ===
In 1948 Holford was appointed by Cambridgeshire County Council as consultant to prepare a plan for Cambridge. In 1950 Holford, along with H Myles Wright produced a report for Cambridgeshire County Council titled "Cambridge Planning Proposals". Holford recommended that Cambridge should not grow. The number of residents should be capped at 100,000 and new manufacturing should not be allowed to develop with the boundaries of the county town. Holford's restrictive strategy only unraveled in the early 1980s when 260 small high tech companies had been established in Cambridge.

Much of the report's road proposals were never completed. This included his proposal to build a ring road around Cambridge, only sections of which were ever built. These sections include Perne Road, Brooks Road and Barnwell Road. At Cambridge railway station the report proposed a new footbridge linking East Cambridge directly to the railway station, with a proposed car park and bus stop on a site off Rustat Road opposite the current station. Despite numerous calls over the decades, an eastern entrance to Cambridge railway station has never been built.

=== Clarendon House ===
Holford designed significant individual buildings, including Clarendon House in Cornmarket Street, Oxford, which was built in 1956–57 for F.W. Woolworth. Sir Nikolaus Pevsner commended Clarendon House in Oxford as one of the best recent buildings in the city's main shopping streets and showing "how this kind of job can be done tactfully and elegantly."

=== Eton College ===
Holford undertook at least three commissions for Eton College: Villiers House (under construction 1960), Farrers House (1959) and the ceiling of Eton College Chapel (1957).

=== Berinsfield ===
In 1960 Holford redesigned part of the former RAF Mount Farm, Oxfordshire to form the new village of Berinsfield. The redesign has been criticized as little more than a huge council estate.

=== Piccadilly Circus ===
From 1961 Holford presented a series of plans to solve road traffic congestion at Piccadilly Circus, some of which included a raised piazza for pedestrians above the ground-level traffic. This concept was kept alive for the rest of 60s, before eventually being terminated by Sir Keith Joseph and Ernest Marples in 1972. The key reason given was that Holford's scheme only allowed for a 20% increase in traffic, whereas the Government wanted 50%.

=== Paternoster Square ===
Holford is noted for his redevelopment plan of the area around St Paul's Cathedral. London had been devastated by aerial bombardment in the Blitz. However, only part of Holford's concept plan was carried out between 1961 and 1967, foremost the Paternoster Square development between St Paul's churchyard and Newgate Street.

St Paul's churchyard and Newgate Street immediately north of one of the capital's prime tourist attractions was widely considered grim and an embarrassment. A redevelopment competition was launched in 1986 and after numerous changes in plans and architects, the new Paternoster Square was completed in 2003.

=== Brasília and Durban ===
Holford was a sought-after consultant outside the UK. In 1957 he was part of the committee selecting Lúcio Costa's plan for Brasília. Between 1965 and 1968 he produced reports on the development of Durban in South Africa.

=== Canberra ===
In the mid-1950s the Robert Menzies Government of Australia asked Holford to report on the planning and development of Canberra, which had become disorganised due to the Great Depression, World War II and post-war economic stringency. His report led to the creation of the National Capital Development Commission (NCDC), which controlled Canberra's development 1957–89, when the city as it exists today was created. He also advised extensively on Canberra's planning and this advice was largely accepted by the NCDC and led to the evolution of Canberra into a city of car-based suburbs based on the British New Town concept. William Holford and Partners worked with English landscape architect Sylvia Crowe on the design of Commonwealth Gardens in 1964.

One unfortunate legacy is the NCDC's acceptance of his recommendation that the proposed new Parliament House be built on the banks of Lake Burley Griffin, rather than on Capital Hill. In 1978 the Parliament of Australia decided that Parliament House would be built on Capital Hill as proposed by its original planner Walter Burley Griffin. The use of the area that the Parliament House was to occupy under the Holford plan has never been fully resolved.

== See also ==
- Master of Civic Design
