= Academic division =

Division of a university by subject area

An academic division, commonly called a faculty in the UK or a school or college in the US, is an academic and administrative unit within a university or college that groups together related departments in a subject or group of subjects.

== History ==
The classical academic divisions in medieval universities were the faculties of arts, laws, medicine and theology. However, there were variations on this: grammar was sometimes split off from the arts into its own faculty, and laws was frequently divided into canon law and civil law. Some universities were devoted to a single discipline, such as Bologna (laws) or Montpellier (medicine), and so were not divided into faculties. Most universities had multiple faculties, and no recognised university was restricted to only arts, but few had all of the faculties. Prior to around 1360 this was confined to Paris, Oxford and Cambridge; from 1380 most new creations had all of the faculties on paper but, particularly for theology and medicine, these could be almost nonexistent in reality.

The faculty of arts took its name from the seven liberal arts of antiquity, comprising the trivium (the verbal disciplines of grammar, rhetoric and logic) and the quadrivium (the four mathematical disciplines of arithmetic, music, geometry and astronomy). However, as early as the mid 13th century these no longer formed the curriculum of arts courses, with some being dropped and other disciplines such as the "three philosophies" (natural philosophy, moral philosophy and metaphysics) being introduced. The components of arts education were united only by their function of preparing a student for higher study. This heterogeneity, and the differences in such higher faculties were offered, led to the content of arts courses diverging across universities. Until the 16th century, arts faculties provided what in the modern period would be called secondary education.

The higher Faculty of Law and Faculty of Medicine were intended, much like today, for specialized education required for professions. The Faculty of Theology was the most prestigious, as well as least common in the first 500 years—and generally one that popes sought most to control. Although also a professional education for clergy, theology (until the Enlightenment) was also seen as the ultimate subject at universities, named "The Queen of the Sciences", and often set the example for the other faculties.

The number of faculties has usually multiplied in modern universities, both through subdivisions of the traditional four faculties and through the absorption of academic disciplines that developed within originally vocational schools, in areas such as engineering or agriculture. The pattern in British universities since the mid 1990s has been for the number of faculties to be reduced on average, but with wide variation. A study of 81 universities found that between 1993 and 2002, 60 had changed their academic structure, of which 29 had reduced the number of faculties (18 of which also reduced the number of departments within the faculties), three increased the number of faculties while reducing the number of departments, and three abolished faculties entirely, replacing theme with schools further from merged departments. A separate study of 68 universities for that 51 had changed their academic structure between 1994 and 2002, with 26 reducing the number of faculties, 12 snoozing the faculties and replacing them with schools, and 11 increasing the number of faculties or schools.

== Terminology ==
At most British universities, academic divisions are called faculties. These are administrative groupings containing multiple academic schools or departments, which do the actual teaching. In the US, academic divisions are usually termed colleges or schools, and some British university have adopted similar nomenclature. At Oxford and Cambridge, "faculties" are academic departments and the academic divisions are called "divisions" and "schools" respectively.
