= Master of Biological Sciences =

Graduate degree

A Master of Biology (or MBiol) is a master's degree in the field of the biological sciences. This field includes the study of topics like plant biology, molecular biology, and animal biology. This is a higher degree taken in a graduate school at a university. This degree is usually pursued by those who have undertaken their undergraduate studies in biology or some other field of natural science (e.g., chemistry).

== Content And Structure ==
=== United Kingdom ===
In the United Kingdom, the MBiol degree is an undergraduate award, available after pursuing a four-year course of study at a university. It is classed as a level 7 qualification in the National Qualifications Framework. In Scotland, the MBiol degree is a 5-year course. In terms of course structure, MBiol degrees have the same content that is usually seen in other degree programmes. There are also usually one or more substantial projects undertaken in the fourth year, which may well have research elements. At the end of the second or third years, there is usually a threshold of academic performance in examinations to be reached to allow progression into the final year. Final results are awarded on the standard British undergraduate degree classification scale. After one has finished their Master of Biology degree, they can become a researcher or a professor for undergraduate studies, or they can pursue a doctorate.

=== United States ===
At many universities in the United States, students may obtain either a Masters of Science (M.S.) or a Masters of Arts (M.A.) degree in biology or an allied field (e.g., zoology). American universities differ in whether coursework alone or a thesis as well as coursework are required for the masters degrees. Depending on the university and program, a thesis may require original research in the laboratory or field, or it may only require reviewing the relevant scientific literature. For some students, the M.S. or M.A. is a terminal degree, while others may move on to pursue a Ph.D. degree at the same university or at another institution.
