= Doctor of Theology =

Doctoral degree

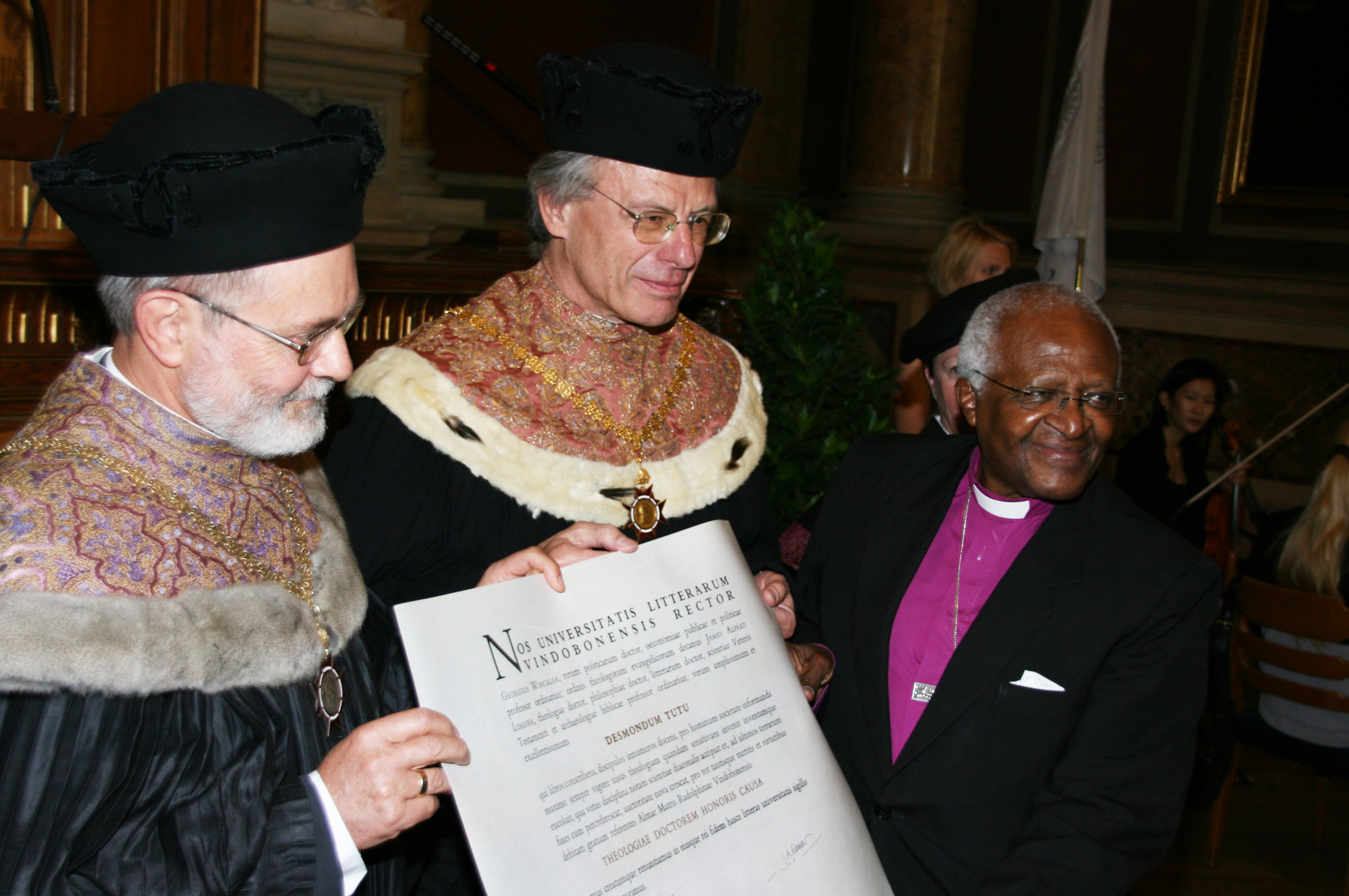
Conferral of a Doctorate of Theology honoris causa on Desmond Tutu (right) by the University of Vienna in 2009.

Doctor of Theology (Latin: Doctor Theologiae, abbreviated DTh, ThD, DTheol, or Dr. theol.) is a terminal degree in the academic discipline of theology. The ThD, like the ecclesiastical Doctor of Sacred Theology, is an advanced research degree equivalent to the Doctor of Philosophy.

== Terminology ==
In the academic study of theology, often deeply rooted in the Christian religion, the nomenclature of doctoral degrees varies between Doctor of Theology, Doctor of Philosophy, and Doctor of Sacred Theology. However, Doctor of Ministry is generally understood as a professional doctorate, whereas Doctor of Divinity is an academic doctorate in the UK and an honorary doctorate in the US where it is often awarded as honoris causa.

=== United States ===
In the United States, some of the older theological seminaries began offering the ThD as an equivalent to the research Doctor of Philosophy. In Princeton Theological Seminary, for example, this practice was inherited from the German system of education, since the professors involved in establishing the doctoral program were trained in German universities. Though the PhD was the doctorate of arts faculties in German universities (called the philosophy faculty in Germany, hence the Ph), Princeton Theological Seminary has since switched to using Doctor of Philosophy as its main designation. A similar shift happened at Harvard Divinity School in 2015. As of 2024, five Association of Theological Schools accredited schools currently accept students to ThD programs: Duke Divinity School, Kairos University, Northwest Nazarene University's Graduate School of Theology, Seventh-day Adventist Theological Seminary, and United Theological Seminary.

Due to the secular push in doctoral studies, some ThD programs have moved to other known accreditation, like the Association for Biblical Higher Education (ABHE), Transnational Association of Christian Colleges and Schools (TRACS), or The Council of Private Colleges of America (CPCA).

=== United Kingdom ===
In the United Kingdom, the Doctor of Theology is a relatively new academic doctoral programme. Certain universities have begun offering it as a form of research-based professional doctorate, not unlike the Doctor of Education. To distinguish the more practical nature of the degree, some British universities have adopted the term Doctor of Practical Theology.
