= Master of Chemistry =

A Master of Chemistry (or MChem) degree is a specific master's degree for courses in the field of Chemistry.

== United Kingdom ==
In the UK, the M.Chem degree is an undergraduate award, available after pursuing a four- or five-year course of study at a university. It is classed as a level 7 qualification in the National Qualifications Framework.

In England the M.Chem degree is a 4-year course, whereas in Scotland the M.Chem degree is a 5-year course.

== Structure ==
In terms of course structure, M.Chem degrees have the same content that is usually seen in other degree programmes, i.e. lectures, laboratory work, coursework and exams each year. There are also usually one or more substantial projects undertaken in the fourth year, which may well have research elements. At the end of the second or third years, there is usually a threshold of academic performance in examinations to be reached to allow progression into the final year. Final results are awarded on the standard British undergraduate degree classification scale.
