= Master of Mathematics =

Academic degree

A Master of Mathematics (or MMath) degree is a specific advanced integrated Master's degree for courses in the field of mathematics.

== United Kingdom ==
In the United Kingdom, the MMath is the internationally recognized standard qualification after a four-year course in mathematics at a university. The MMath programme was set up by most leading universities after the Neumann Report in 1992. It is classed as a level 7 qualification in the Frameworks of Higher Education Qualifications of UK Degree-Awarding Bodies. The UCAS course codes for the MMath degrees start at G100 upwards, most courses taking the codes G101 - G104.

Universities which offer MMath degrees include:

- Aberystwyth University
- University of Bath
- University of Bristol (MSci)
- Brunel University
- University of Birmingham (MSci)
- Cardiff University
- University of Cambridge (Note: In Cambridge the MMath was first awarded in 2011 after a four year course. The fourth year is identical with the Master of Advanced Study in Mathematics, which was formerly known as the Certificate of Advanced Study in Mathematics and is open to students from other universities. Everyone who completed Part III since 1962 became eligible for the appropriate Master's degree, retrospectively.)
- City University London
- University of Central Lancashire
- University of Dundee
- University of Durham
- University of East Anglia
- University of Edinburgh
- University of Essex
- University of Exeter
- University of Glasgow
- Heriot-Watt University
- University of Hull
- University of Keele
- University of Kent
- Lancaster University
- University of Leeds
- University of Leicester
- University of Lincoln
- University of Liverpool
- Liverpool Hope University
- Loughborough University
- University of Manchester
- Manchester Metropolitan University
- Middlesex University (from 2014)
- Newcastle University
- Northumbria University
- University of Nottingham
- Nottingham Trent University
- Open University (until 2007)
- Oxford Brookes University
- University of Oxford
- University of Plymouth
- University of Portsmouth
- University of Reading
- University of St Andrews
- University of Sheffield
- University of Southampton
- University of Strathclyde
- University of Surrey
- University of Sussex
- Swansea University
- University of Warwick
- University of York

== Canada ==
In Canada, the MMath is a graduate degree offered by the University of Waterloo. The length of the MMath degree program is typically between one and two years, and consists of course work along with a research component. The first Waterloo MMath degrees were awarded in 1967. MMath is the master's degree offered by David R. Cheriton School of Computer Science, since it is within the Faculty of Mathematics at Waterloo.

== India ==
In India, the M. Math. is a graduate degree offered by the Indian Statistical Institute. The course consists of two years and is done in the Bangalore and Kolkata centres in alternating years. The participants are selected through two screening (one objective and other subjective) tests along with an interview and it is arguably the best graduate course in mathematics offered in India.

== See also ==
- Bachelor of Mathematics
- British degree abbreviations
- Bachelor's degrees
- Master's degrees
