= Master of Advanced Studies =

Master's degree

A Master of Advanced Studies (MASt or MAS; or Master of Advanced Study) is a postgraduate degree awarded in various countries. Master of Advanced Studies programs may be non-consecutive programs tailored for "specific groups of working professionals with well-defined needs for advanced degree work" or advanced research degrees. With the exception of the several schools in the UK, advanced studies programs tend to be interdisciplinary and tend to be focused toward meeting the needs of professionals rather than academics. The Master of Advanced Studies is also often referred as Executive Master because it is aimed at working professionals (see the LSE in the UK programs for example or INSEAD and HEC programs in France)

== United Kingdom ==
The University of Cambridge began offering the Master of Advanced Study in 2010 as a one-year master's degree in Mathematics as a replacement for the "Part III exam in Mathematics". Cambridge currently offers Master of Advanced Study degrees in four fields of study. The University of Warwick has approved the introduction of a Master of Advanced Study (MASt) degree in Mathematics for the 2013/2014 year.

== United States ==
In the United States, the Master of Advanced Study or the Master of Advanced Studies degree is a post-graduate professional degree issued by numerous academic institutions, but most notably by the University of California. M.A.S. programs tend to "concentrate on a set of coordinated coursework with culminating projects or papers rather than emphasizing student research" and frequently are structured as interdisciplinary offerings.

== France and francophone countries ==
A master of advanced studies exists in France: Diplôme d'études supérieures spécialisées (DESA). It is not to be confused with the Diplôme d'études approfondies or DEA (equivalent to Master 2 in France and a MPhil in the UK) program and the French MBA and Mastère which titles are not accredited by the State in France. The Master of Advanced Studies is open to people with a 4 years undergraduate degree (Master 1) and a minimum of 4 or 5 years of experience. It is usually taken by full-time workers. It is a selective degree. It is compliant with the Bologna ECTS and provides 60 ECTS. The majority of executive masters have full days (no more than a full week) of courses per month over a period of two to three years.

The Master of Advanced Studies is also known in France as Executive Master.

== German-speaking countries ==
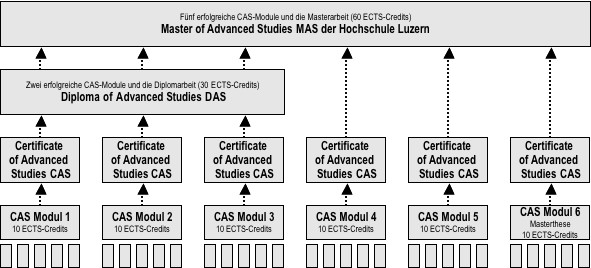
Master of Advanced Studies (MAS) Program

The degree of Master of Advanced Studies is awarded in Switzerland, Austria and Liechtenstein as a continuing education (Weiterbildung) degree. In Switzerland, the degree is recognized by federal law. Generally, a university degree is required for admission, but also work experience and non-formal education can be considered in addition to formal education. A MAS requires 60-120 ECTS. and usually consists of course work, independent study and a masters thesis.

== Spain ==
This degree also exists in Spain under the name "Diploma de Estudios Avanzados". It confers a higher qualification credential than a Master of Philosophy or Master of Studies but lower than old doctorate prior to European Higher Education Area (EHEA), however equivalent to new (EHEA) doctoral degree. The so-called "DEA" was achieved in two years: one year of coursework, which included research methods and theoretical approaches of the discipline at stake (depending on the area of specialization) and one year of research. All the work of the first and second years was defended before a panel. The DEA was for the elaboration of the old PhD proposal and the commencement or a prerequisite of PhD research in Spain before European Higher Education Area (EHEA) and Bologna process.

== European Union ==
Students of the College of Europe (an independent university institute of postgraduate European studies with its campuses in Bruges (Belgium) and Natolin (Poland) receive an advanced master's degree (formerly called Diploma and Certificat) following a one-year intense programme. The one-year study programme at the College of Europe leads to an accredited degree of 66 ECTS.

== See also ==
- Master of Advanced International Studies
