= Master of Physics =

Academic degree

A Master of Physics honours (or MPhys (Hons)) degree is a specific master's degree for courses in the field of physics.

== United Kingdom ==
In England and Wales, the MPhys is an undergraduate award available after pursuing a four-year course of study at a university. In Scotland the course has a five-year duration. In some universities, the degree has the variant abbreviation MSci. These are taught courses, with a research element in the final year — this can vary from a small component to an entire year working with a research group — and are not available as postgraduate qualifications in most cases, although depending on institution the final year can be considered as approximately equivalent to an MSc.

=== Structure ===
In terms of course structure, MPhys degrees usually follow the pattern familiar from bachelor's degrees with lectures, laboratory work, coursework and exams each year. Usually one, or more commonly two, substantial projects are to be completed in the fourth year which may well have research elements. At the end of the second or third years, there is usually a threshold of academic performance in examinations to be reached to allow progression into the final year. Final results are, in most cases, awarded on the standard British undergraduate degree classification scale, although some universities award something structurally similar to 'Distinction', 'Merit', 'Pass' or 'Fail', as this is often the way that taught postgraduate master's degrees are classified.

=== Degree schemes ===
It is usual for there to be some variation in the MPhys schemes, to allow for students to study the area of physics which most interests them. For example, Lancaster University's physics department offer the following schemes:

- MPhys Physics
- MPhys Physics, Astrophysics and Cosmology
- MPhys Physics with Particle Physics and Cosmology
- MPhys Physics with Space Science
- MPhys Physics with Biomedical Physics
- MPhys Theoretical Physics
- MPhys Theoretical Physics with Mathematics

These schemes will usually incorporate the same core modules with additional scheme specific modules. Students tend to take all the same core modules during their first year and start to specialise in their second year. In some cases, optional modules can be taken from other schemes.

== See also ==
- British degree abbreviations
- Bachelor's degrees
- Master's degrees
