= Master of Civic Design =

A Master of Civic Design (MCD) is a postgraduate academic master degree in Town and Regional Planning awarded by the University of Liverpool, England. The degree level is equivalent to a Master of Arts or Master of Science postgraduate degree in alternative disciplines.

The degree (MCD) is unique in that it is the only taught postgraduate degree with that label. The University of Liverpool's Department of Civic Design was the world's first planning school, and as such the MCD label uniquely identifies graduates from the department. In 2022 the MCD celebrated its Platinum Jubiliee.

The degree is a taught programme of study that enables students from a wide range of undergraduate degree backgrounds to embark on a career of professional practice in town planning and related fields. The degree is typically studied as a one year full-time or two year part-time programme with full accreditation from the Royal Town Planning Institute Royal Town Planning Institute.

There are currently two versions of the MCD which both carry full accreditation from the RTPI.

The MCD Town and Regional Planning explores the social, economic and environmental challenges planners face, and instills a knowledge of the planning tools and methods which planners use to address these, and how they can be applied to particular planning contexts. This MCD programme introduces the essential aspects of town and regional planning.

The MCD Urban Design and Planning offers insights into the social, economic, and environmental challenges that urban planners face in designing cities that are functional, liveable, and sustainable. It also covers various planning and urban design tools and methods that are used to address these challenges, and explores how they can be applied to specific contexts.
