= Doctor of Clinical Psychology =

The degree of Doctor of Clinical Psychology (DClinPsy/DClinPsych/ClinPsyD) is a professional doctorate in clinical psychology, awarded mainly in the United Kingdom and Ireland. The degree has both clinical and research components, and qualifies the holder to practice as a clinical psychologist in Britain's National Health Service and other clinical settings. It bears some similarities to the Doctor of Psychology degree in the United States.

== By nation ==
=== Denmark ===
In Denmark the corresponding degree is called "specialpsykolog" (Special Psychologist) or "specialist i **" (Specialist Psychologist in **).

=== Netherlands ===
In the Netherlands the corresponding degree is "gezondheidszorgpsycholoog" (Healthcare Psychologist).

=== Spain ===
In Spain, the postgraduate training in Clinical Psychology is carried out as 4 years intern residence within the National Health System and the title obtained is "Especialista en Psicología Clínica [Specialist in Clinical Psychology]", usually abbreviated "EPC".

=== Italy ===
In Italy, postgraduate training leading to the professional licence to practice as a psychotherapist is carried out as a 5-year programme involving 400 hours of theoretical training and 400 hours of clinical practicum every year. Trainees are attached to clinical units of the Italian national health system and are required to spend part of their training carrying out research and defend their specialization thesis before an academic board, which will consider the conferment of the title of "specialista" in psychotherapy. Four different specialist degrees lead to the license as a psychotherapist: Specialist in Clinical Psychology, Specialist in Health Psychology, Specialist in Lifespan Psychology and Specialist in Neuropsychology.

=== New Zealand ===
In New Zealand, students can study to become a clinical psychologist through a Doctor of Clinical Psychology at the University of Auckland or Massey University, or through a Postgraduate Diploma in Clinical Psychology (completed concurrently with either a Master of Science or Arts in Psychology, or alternatively a PhD) at the University of Otago.

=== Ireland ===
In Ireland doctoral programmes in Clinical Psychology are accredited by the Psychological Society of Ireland. Irish universities offering professional doctoral programmes in Clinical Psychology include Trinity College Dublin, University College Dublin, and University College Cork.

=== United Kingdom ===
In the United Kingdom, doctoral programmes in Clinical Psychology are accredited by the British Psychological Society and approved by the Health and Care Professions Council, the statutory regulator for practitioner psychologists and courses in the UK. The doctorate in clinical psychology programme normally lasts three years, and funding is provided by the National Health Service. A Doctorate in Clinical Psychology is necessary to register as a practitioner clinical psychologist with the Health and Care Professions Council. The UK DClinPsy application process is very competitive, with less than 30% of applicants securing a place.

British universities offering professional doctoral programmes in Clinical Psychology include Bangor University (first in the UK to establish the doctorate), University of Edinburgh, University of Glasgow, University of Hertfordshire, Lancaster University, University of East London, University of Sheffield, University of Liverpool, University College London, Newcastle University, Queen's University Belfast,University of Oxford, Cardiff University and the University of Hull. There is a central clearinghouse for applications to Doctor of Clinical Psychology programmes, hosted by the University of Leeds. Information and discussion about the UK system of training in clinical psychology, the typical requirements needed to gain a place on a doctoral training course, and what the doctorate allows graduates to do can be found on the ClinPsy website and forum.

== See also ==
- Doctor of Psychology
