= Master of Studies =

Type of postgraduate degree

A Master of Studies or Master in Studies (M.St., MSt, or MStud;Latin: Magister in Studiis or Magister Studiorum) is the holder of a postgraduate degree awarded by the University of Oxford, University of Cambridge, University of St Andrews, the Australian National University, the University of Dublin, New Saint Andrews College,, and the University of Newcastle (Australia). Depending on the degree, it is comparable to a Master of Arts, Master of Business Administration, Master of Laws, Master of Philosophy, and Master of Science.

Its creation was partly driven by the fact that the Master of Arts degree at Oxford, Cambridge, and Dublin is awarded to most Bachelors of Arts after a certain period of time. In contrast, the degree of Master of Studies requires completion of a specific course of academic studies and the approval of a thesis.

== See also ==
- British degree abbreviations
- Master's degree in Europe
- Master of Studies in Law
- Master of Philosophy
