= Doctor of Practical Theology =

The Doctor of Practical Theology (DPT, DPTh) is a professional doctorate developed for those seeking to apply theological principles to their professional practice. It should not be confused with a Doctor of Philosophy in Practical Theology such as offered by Princeton Theological Seminary.

== Overview ==
The typical degree candidate is a part-time student who continues full-time professional responsibilities. The modern development of this program in the United Kingdom (DPT) has been greatly influenced by educators and other professionals affiliated with the Association of Practical Theology (APT, established 1984).

The Doctor of Practical Theology is typically a multidisciplinary program designed for consideration, reflection, examination and application of theological principles appropriate to practice-based settings. Further, it serves as a foundation for an original project contributing to solutions and development of the student's organization and/or profession.

The Doctor of Practical Theology customarily integrates theological concepts into the context of professional practice. Most programs customarily include:

- Practice-based research and enquiry-based learning methods, in which the student's own professional context becomes a primary resource in research, and
- Courses consisting of assignments, reading, and research designed to strengthen writing and critical thinking skills while integrating theological principles and concepts with the context of the student's professional practice.

The Doctor of Practical Theology is applicable to:

- Public sector professions, such as health care, education, social services,
- Caring professions, such as psychotherapy, pastoral care and counseling, alternative dispute resolution (ADR), mediation, social work and community development,
- Church ministers in parish, congregational or chaplaincy settings
- Non-profit professions, such as charities, non-governmental organizations, cultural organizations, or the arts,
- Business and industry professionals with an interest in the subject

The Doctor of Practical Theology (DPTh) is rarely offered today in United States. Most seminary and divinity schools there have replaced their degree studies in practical theology to majors within programs leading to the Doctor of Ministry (D.Min.), Doctor of Philosophy (Ph.D.) and Doctor of Arts (DA). The specialized program is still offered in France (DThP), and more recently, the United Kingdom (DPT), and in Canada where McMaster Divinity College offers a Doctor of Practical Theology (DPT).

Examples of schools offering the degree are:

- University of Glasgow, School of Critical Studies
- McMaster Divinity College
