= Master of Arts =

Type of postgraduate qualification

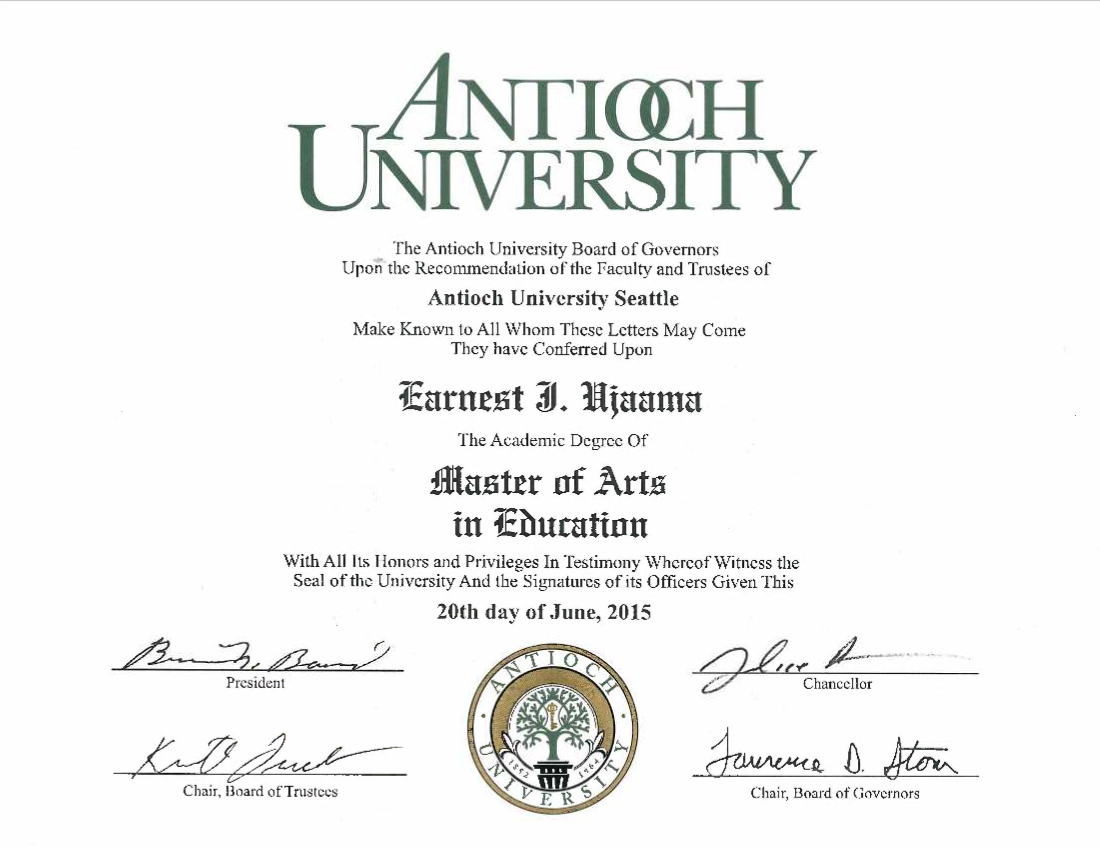
- A Master of Arts degree in Education from Antioch University
- Acronym: MA; AM
- Type: Master's degree
- Duration: 1 to 4 years (varies)

The Master of Arts (Latin: Magister Artium or Artium Magister; abbreviated MA or AM) is a master's degree awarded by universities in many countries. The degree is usually contrasted with that of Master of Science. Those admitted to the degree have typically studied subjects within the scope of the humanities and social sciences, such as history, economics, literature, languages, linguistics, public administration, political science, communication studies, law or diplomacy; however, different universities have different conventions and may also offer the degree for fields typically considered within the natural sciences and mathematics. The degree can be conferred in respect of completing courses and passing examinations, research, or a combination of the two.

The degree of Master of Arts traces its origins to the teaching license or Licentia docendi of the University of Paris, designed to produce "masters" who were graduate teachers of their subjects.

== Europe ==
=== Czech Republic and Slovakia ===
Like all EU member states, the Czech Republic and Slovakia follow the Bologna Process. The Czech Republic and Slovakia both award two different types of master's degrees; both award a title of Mgr. or Ing. to be used before the name.

Prior to reforms for compliance with the Bologna process, a master's degree could only be obtained after five years of uninterrupted study. Under the new system, it takes only two years but requires a previously completed three-year bachelor's program (a Bc. title). Writing a thesis (in both master's and bachelor's programs) and passing final exams are necessary to obtain the degree. It is mostly the case that the final exams cover the main study areas of the whole study program, i.e. a student is required to prove their knowledge in the subjects they attended during the two resp. three years of their study. Exams also include the defence of a thesis before an academic board.

Ing. (Engineer) degrees are usually awarded for master's degrees achieved in the natural sciences or mathematics-heavy study programmes, whereas an Mgr. (Magister) is generally awarded for master's studies in social sciences or the humanities while an MgA. (Magister of Arts) is awarded for studies in the arts.

=== Germany ===
In Germany, the Master of Arts degree was called in Latin Magister Artium. This degree, which usually required between four and four and a half years of studies, existed in the Holy Roman Empire and its successors, including the German Empire and the Federal Republic of Germany, but not in the former East Germany, where all degree courses led to a Diplom. Traditional Magister degrees are granted in social sciences and most of the humanities (international business, European studies and economics included), with the exception of visual and performing arts such as music and theatre.

The Magister Artium held either a double major degree or a combination of one major and two minors. German postgraduate Master of Arts and Master of Science degrees were introduced in 2001. Therefore, the new Master of Arts and the old Magister Artium degrees have existed side by side, since 2010; Magister Artium degrees are still awarded by some universities, as of 2020. The new Bachelor of Arts and Master of Arts degrees together also require five years of studies, which is the reason the new Master of Arts and the old Magister Artium degrees are considered equivalent.

=== Netherlands ===
In the Netherlands, the Master of Arts and the Master of Science degrees were introduced in 2002. Until that time, a single program that led to the doctorandus degree (or the ingenieur degree in the case of technical subjects) was in effect, which comprised the same course-load as the bachelor's and master's programs put together. Those who had already started the doctorandus program could, upon completing it, opt for the doctorandus degree, which gave the title "Doctorandus" before their name, abbreviated to 'drs.'; in the case of ingenieur, this would be 'ir.'), or else opt for a master's degree as postnominals behind their name, in accordance with the new standard ('MA' or 'MSc'). A master's degree can take one or two years to complete.

=== Poland ===
The Polish equivalent of Master of Arts is "magister" (its abbreviation "mgr" is placed before one's name, like the title Dr). At the technical universities, a student is awarded with inżynier (engineer) after three years and then with "magister" after completing another two years of study and graduating. Such persons use titles "mgr inż". In the 1990s, the MA programs usually lasting five years were replaced by separate three-year bachelor's and two-year master's programs. The degree is awarded in the arts (visual arts, literature, foreign languages, filmmaking, theatre etc.), natural sciences, mathematics, computer science fields, and economics. The completion of a research thesis is required. All master's degrees in Poland qualify for a doctorate program.

=== Nordic countries ===
In Finland, Denmark and Norway, the master's degree is a combined taught/research degree, awarded after two years of studies after completing the bachelor's degree. The student is required to write a scientific thesis.

In Finland, this master's degree is called a filosofian maisteri (in Finnish) or filosofie magister (in Swedish), and it is abbreviated as FM or "fil.mag.".

In Sweden, there is still an intermediate degree between the bachelor's (kandidat) and master's called magister which only requires one year of studies, including a scientific thesis after completing the bachelor's degree. This fourth year typically constitutes the first half of a master's programme. If not, it may be supplemented by a fifth year and a master's thesis to obtain a master's degree in the field of study.

=== United Kingdom and Ireland ===
==== Most universities ====
Except at Aberdeen, Cambridge, Dublin, Edinburgh, Glasgow, Oxford and St. Andrews (see below), the MA is typically a "taught" postgraduate degree, involving lectures, examination, and a dissertation based on independent research. Taught master's programmes involve one or two years of full-time study. Many can be done part-time as well. Until recently, both the undergraduate and postgraduate master's degrees were awarded without grade or class (like the class of an honours degree). Nowadays, however, master's degrees are normally classified into the categories of Fail, Pass, Pass with Merit, or Pass with Distinction. This education pattern in the United Kingdom is followed in Pakistan and many Commonwealth Nations.

The Master of Laws (LLM) is the standard degree taught for law, but certain courses may lead to MA, MLitt, Master of Studies (MSt), and the Bachelor of Civil Law (BCL) at Oxford. All of these degrees are considered substitutes to one another and are thus generally equivalent.

==== Scotland ====
In the ancient universities of Scotland, the degree of Master of Arts is awarded in universities as a four-year undergraduate degree, see Master of Arts (Scotland).

The degree of Master of Arts is the first degree awarded in arts, humanities, theology, and social sciences. However, some universities in Scotland award the degree of Master of Letters (MLitt) to students in the arts, humanities, divinity, and social sciences.

==== Oxford, Cambridge and Dublin ====
At Oxford, Cambridge and the University of Dublin, the title of Master of Arts is conferred after a certain number of years, without further examination, to those who have graduated as Bachelor of Arts and who have the requisite years' standing as members of the university or as graduates. This happens, in England, only at the universities of Oxford, four years after completing a bachelor's degree, and Cambridge, six years after the first term of study. It is also the case at the University of Dublin. The abbreviated name of the university (Oxon, Cantab or Dubl) is therefore almost always appended in parentheses to the initials "MA" in the same way that it is to higher degrees, e.g. "John Smith, MA (Cantab), PhD (Lond)", principally so that it is clear (to those who are aware of the system) that these are nominal and unexamined degrees.

The MLitt is a research degree at the University of Cambridge, where the Master of Philosophy (MPhil) is the name given to the standard one-year taught degree with a unique research element, in contrast to the use of MPhil at other institutions for a research degree.

===== Confusion =====
Research in 2000 by the universities watchdog, the Quality Assurance Agency for Higher Education, showed that two-thirds of employers were unaware that the Oxford and Cambridge MA did not represent any kind of post-graduate achievement.

In February 2011, the Labour Member of Parliament Chris Leslie sponsored a private member's bill in Parliament, the master's degrees (Minimum Standards) Bill, to "prohibit universities awarding master's degrees unless certain standards of study and assessment are met". The bill's supporters described the practice as a "historical anachronism" and argued that "unearned qualifications" should be discontinued to preserve the academic integrity of the taught MA. Further, they warned that the title gave Oxbridge graduates an unfair advantage in the job market. On 21 October 2011, the bill received its second reading, but it failed to complete its passage through Parliament before the end of the session, meaning it fell.

== North America ==
In Canada and the United States, the Master of Arts (Magister Artium), along with the Master of Science (Magister Scientiæ), is the basic graduate-level degrees in most subjects and may be course-based, research-based, or, more typically, a combination of the two.

Admission to a master's program is normally contingent upon holding a bachelor's degree. Some programs provide for a joint bachelor's and master's after about five years. Some universities use the Latin degree name, such as Artium Magister (AM). For example, Harvard University, Dartmouth College, the University of Chicago, the Massachusetts Institute of Technology, the University of Pennsylvania, and Brown University use the abbreviations AM for some of their master's degrees. A Master of Arts may be given in a scientific discipline, common at Ivy League universities.

Many universities offer Master of Arts programs, which are differentiated either as Thesis or Non-Thesis programs. Usually, the duration for a Non-Thesis option is one to two years of full-time study. The period for a Thesis option may last longer, depending also on the required level of courses and complexity of the thesis. Sometimes, qualified students who are admitted to a "very high research" Master of Arts might have to earn credits also at the PhD level, and they may need to complete their program in about three years of full-time candidature, e.g. at Harvard in the United States and McGill in Canada.

A thesis must be a distinct contribution to knowledge. It must demonstrate ability to plan and carry out research, organize results, and defend the approach and conclusions in a scholarly manner. The research presented must meet current standards of the discipline. Finally, the thesis must clearly demonstrate how the research advances knowledge in the field.
