= List of master's degrees =

This is a list of master's degrees; many are offered as "tagged degrees"

- Master of Accountancy
- Master of Advanced Study
- Master of Agricultural Economics
- Master of Applied Finance
- Master of Applied Science
- Master of Architecture
- Master of Arts
  - Master of Arts in Liberal Studies
  - Master of Arts in Special Education
  - Master of Arts in Teaching
- Master of Bioethics
- Master of Botany
- Master of Business Administration
- Master of Business, Entrepreneurship and Technology
- Master of Business
- Master of Business Engineering
- Master of Business Informatics
- Master of Chemistry
- Master of Christian Education
- Master of City Planning
- Master of Commerce
- Master of Computational Finance
- Master of Computer Applications
- Master of Computer Science
- Master of Counselling
- Master of Criminal Justice
- Master of Creative Technologies
- Master of Data Science
- Master of Defence Administration
- Master of Defence Studies
- Master of Design
- Masters of Development Economics
- Master of Divinity
- Master of Economics
- Master of Education
- Master of Engineering
  - Master of Engineering Management
  - Master of Applied Science
- Master of Enterprise
- Master of European Law
- Master of Finance
  - Master of Financial Economics
  - Master of Financial Engineering
  - Master of Financial Mathematics
- Master of Fine Arts
- Master of Health Administration
- Master of Health Economics
- Master of Health Science
- Master of Humanities
- Master of Industrial and Labor Relations
- Master of International Affairs
- Master of International Business
- Master of International Economics
- Master of International Studies
- Master of Information and Cybersecurity
- Master of Information and Data Science
- Master of Information Management
- Master of Information System Management
- Master of Journalism
- Master of Jurisprudence
- Master of Laws
- Master of Mass Communication
- Master of Studies in Law
- Master of Landscape Architecture
- Master of Letters
- Master of Liberal Arts
  - Master of Liberal Arts in Extension Studies
- Master of Library and Information Science
- Master of Management
- Master of Management of Innovation
- Master of Marketing Research
- Master of Mathematical Finance
- Master of Mathematics
- Master of Medical Science
- Master of Medicine
- Master of Military Art and Science
- Master of Military Operational Art and Science
- Master of Ministry
- Master of Music
- Master of Music Education
- Master of Natural Resources
- Master of Occupational Behaviour and Development
- Master of Occupational Therapy
- Master of Pharmacy
- Master of Philosophy
- Master of Physician Assistant Studies
- Master of Physics
- Master of Plant Biology
- Master of Plant Breeding
- Master of Political Science
- Master of Professional Studies
- Master of Psychology
- Master of Public Administration
- Master of Public Affairs
- Master of Public Health
- Master of Public Management
- Master of Public Policy
- Master of Public Relations
- Master of Public Service
- Master of Quantitative Finance
- Master of Rabbinic Studies
- Master of Real Estate Development
- Master of Religious Education
- Master of Research
- Master of Sacred Music
- Master of Sacred Theology
- Master of Science
  - Master of Science in Administration
  - Master of Science in Archaeology
  - Master of Science in Biblical Archaeology
  - Master of Science in Bioinformatics
  - Master of Science in Cardiovascular Perfusion
  - Master of Science in Computer Science
  - Master of Science in Counselling
  - Master of Science in Cyber Security
  - Master of Science in Engineering
  - Master of Science in Development Administration
  - Master of Science in Finance
  - Master of Science in Foreign Service
  - Master of Science in Health Informatics
  - Master of Science in Human Resource Development
  - Master of Science in Information Assurance
  - Master of Science in Information Systems
  - Master of Science in Information Technology
  - Master of Science in Leadership
  - Master of Science in Management
  - Master of Science in Medical Laboratory Sciences (MS MLS)
  - Master of Science in Nursing
  - Master of Science in Plant Pathology
  - Master of Science in Project Management
  - Master of Science in Quality Management and Analytics
  - Master of Science in Radiologist Assistant (MSRS)
  - Master of Science in Supply Chain Management
  - Master of Science in Teaching
  - Master of Science in Taxation
  - Master of Science in Yoga Therapy
- Master of Social Science
- Master of Social Work
- Master of Strategic Studies
- Master of Studies
- Master of Surgery
- Master of Talmudic Law
- Master of Taxation
- Master of Theological Studies
- Master of Technology
- Master of Technology Management
- Master of Theology
- Master of Urban Planning
- Master of Veterinary Science
