= List of master's degrees in North America =

This list refers to specific master's degrees in North America. Please see master's degree for a more general overview.

== Accountancy ==
Master of Accountancy (MAcc, MAc, MAcy or MPAcc), alternatively Master of Professional Accountancy (MPAcy or MPA), or Master Science in Accountancy (MSAcy) is typically a one-year, non-thesis graduate program designed to prepare graduates for public accounting and to provide them with the 150 credit hours required by most states before taking the CPA exam.

Master of Accounting (MAcc) is an 8-month degree offered by the University of Waterloo, School of Accounting and Finance in Canada that satisfies the 51 credit hours and CKE exam requirement needed to write the Chartered Accountant Uniform Final Exam (UFE) in the province of Ontario. The School also delivers a Master of Taxation program. The School is housed in the Faculty of Arts.

Master of Professional Accounting (MPAcc) is a two-year, non-thesis graduate program offered by the University of Saskatchewan in Canada. In the United States, the University of Texas at Austin offers a Masters of Professional Accounting (MPA) degree.

== Administration ==
Master of Business Administration (MBA), Master of Management (MAM), Master of Accountancy (MAcy), Master of Science in Taxation (MST), Master of Science in Finance (MSF), Master of Business and Organizational Leadership (MBOL), Master of Engineering Management (MEM), Master of Health Administration (MHA), Master of Not-for-Profit Leadership (MNPL), Master of Public Policy (MPP), Master of Policy, Planning and, Management (MPPM), Master of Public Administration (MPA), Master of International Affairs (MIA), Master of Global Affairs (MGA), Master of Strategic Planning for Critical Infrastructures (MSPCI), Master of Science in Strategic Leadership (MSSL), and Master of Science in Management (MSM) are professional degrees focusing on management for the private and public sectors, both domestic and international.

== Adult Education ==
While other advanced degree education programs tend to be more widely known, the Master of Science in Adult Education provides professional educators with expert-level tools for success in the adult learning environment and advancement in educational leadership. As the name suggests, this degree program provides ample opportunity for the student to take a more scientific approach to the study of education. Many M.S. Adult Education programs offer concentrations in Community Service and Health Sciences (non-profit realm), Human Resources, Technology (distance learning), and Training and Development (corporate or for-profit environment).

== Advanced Study ==
In the United States the Master of Advanced Study (M.A.S.) also the Master of Advanced Studies (MAS) degree is a post-graduate professional degree issued by numerous academic institutions, but most notably by the University of California. M.A.S. programs tend to "concentrate on a set of coordinated coursework with culminating projects or papers rather than emphasizing student research" and frequently are structured as interdisciplinary offerings.

In Canada, the Master of Advanced Study degree is an independent research degree.

Advanced Studies programs tend to be interdisciplinary and tend to be focused toward meeting the needs of professionals rather than academics.

== Appalachian Studies ==
The Master of Appalachian Studies focuses on research into culture, i.e. music, sociology, and sustainability within the region of cultural and geographic region of Appalachia. This degree primarily develops understanding of the historical, political, geographic, and socio-economic circumstances that have led to Appalachia and similar regions to become what they are today.

== Applied Anthropology ==
The Master of Applied Anthropology (MAA) is a two-year program focused on training non-academic anthropologists. The University of Maryland, College Park developed this program to encourage entrepreneurial approaches to careers outside academia, where most new anthropologists are likely to seek and find employment. For this reason, it is considered a professional degree rather than a liberal arts degree.

== Applied Ethics ==
Applied ethics programs typically focus on the practical use of ethical theory to address real-world issues. These programs are differentiated from traditional ethics and bioethics programs by their focus how ethical principles translate to actionable methodologies, frameworks, and policies to guide governance, research, medicine, public interests, and private industry. The Duke Master's in Applied Ethics & Policy is a 1-year master's degree program offered by the Graduate School at Duke University that provides two tracks in bioethics and tech ethics.

== Applied Politics ==
The Master of Applied Politics is a 2-year master's degree program offered by The Ray C. Bliss Institute of Applied Politics at The University of Akron. It is one of the few professional master's degree programs in the United States focusing on practical politics and efforts to influence political decisions. This includes winning elections, campaigning, fund raising, influencing legislation and strengthening political organizations. MAP graduates have gone on to manage campaigns, run for political office, join polling and fundraising firms, and start their own consulting firms.

== Applied Sciences ==
The two Master's programs offered in Management Sciences provide both course work and research opportunities in the areas of operations research, information systems, management of technology, engineering and other areas. Operations research, mathematical modeling, economics, and organizational behavior, and other related concepts underlie success in almost all areas of management. Refer to the Master of Engineering degree section for more information.

== Architecture ==
The 4+3 or 5-year Master of Architecture (M.Arch. I) is a first professional degree, after which one is eligible for internship credit [and subsequent exam] required for licensure. The 2-year Master of Architecture (M.Arch. II) is a graduate-level program which assumes previous coursework in architecture (B.Arch. or M. Arch I).

== Archival Studies ==
The Master of Archival Studies degree is awarded following completion of a program of courses in archival science, records management and preservation. The degree was first offered at the University of British Columbia (Canada), and is currently offered at Clayton State University (Georgia). The Master of Archives and Records Administration is offered by San Jose State University (California).

== Bioinformatics ==
The Master of Science in Bioinformatics degree builds on a background in biology and computing. Students learn how to develop software tools for the storage and manipulation of biological data. Graduates typically work in the biotechnology or pharmaceutical industries or in biomedical research. The career prospects are excellent.

== Biomedical Sciences ==
The Master of Biomedical Sciences (MBS) degree prepares students for medical schools, related health professions, and other biomedical careers. The curriculum integrates graduate level human biological sciences with skill development in critical thinking, communication and teamwork.

== Broadcast Journalism ==
The Master of Broadcast Journalism (MBJ) degree prepares students for reporting and journalism in television and radio broadcasting, i.e. on the scene reporting and newsroom newscasting and meteorology.

== Chemistry ==
The Masters of Science in Chemistry is a degree that prepares recipients for jobs as higher-level industrial chemists, laboratory technicians, and for doctorate programs in Chemistry. Schools often offer two programs - a coursework-based masters and a research-based masters. The coursework masters is offered through completion of a number of graduate level chemistry classes and may require the recipient to complete a research proposal to demonstrate their expertise. The research masters is offered through completion a certain number of hours devoted to academic chemistry research, classes related to the research being performed, and the completion of a thesis consisting of the research completed during the masters and its impact of the research on the field.

== Christian Education ==
The Master of Arts in Christian Education is a seminary degree primarily designed for those in the field of church ministry. Various specializations include children's ministry and youth ministry, among others. Thus, many children's pastors and youth pastors obtain the degree, while senior pastors usually pursue the Master of Divinity degree. The degree is usually obtained in 2–3 years.

== City and Regional Planning ==
Master of City and Regional Planning (MCRP) is a professional degree in the study of urban planning.

== Clinical Medical Science ==
Clinical Medical Science is a professional degree awarded to Physician Assistants.

== Communication ==
The Department of Communication of the University of Ottawa offers a Master of Arts (MA) in Communication degree with thesis or with research paper.

The program focuses on five fields of specialization: media studies; organizational communication; health communication; identity and diversity in communication; government communication.

Both teaching and research explore major issues related to new information and communication technologies in media and organizations at the national and international levels.

The academic department of Art History & Communication Studies at McGill University offers Master of Arts (M.A.) degrees, which are differentiated either as Interdisciplinary (Thesis/Non-Thesis) or as Noninterdisciplinary (Thesis/Non-Thesis) programs. The duration for a Non-Thesis option is two years of full-time study. The period for a Thesis option may last longer, depending also on the required level of courses and complexity of the thesis. Students who are admitted to the Interdisciplinary Thesis option Communication Studies - Gender and Women's Studies (incl. e.g. psychology and/or other subjects) might have to earn "very high research" credits at the 700-PhD-level, and they may need to complete their program in the maximum of three years of full-time candidature.

The Communication & Media Arts Department at Lancaster Bible College offers a Master of Arts (MA) degree in Strategic Communication Leadership.

== Computer Science ==
The Master of Science in Computer Science and Master of Science in Information Technology are graduate degrees for information technology professionals and computer engineers. They are generally based on core computer science subjects where knowledge can be used for advanced work especially in the information technology industry.

== Community Health and Prevention Research ==
A Master of Science in Community Health and Prevention Research is a graduate degree for students interested in advancing health in communities through evidence based science. The degree is similar to a public health degree with an emphasis on epidemiology, measurement, research, and statistics in the coursework though with a strong applied focus and emphasis on community engagement; theory and applied principles of behavior change; and intervention development, evaluation, and dissemination. Programs may combine in-class instruction, faculty and peer-to-peer mentoring, with community-based internships.

== Criminal Justice ==
The Master of Criminal Justice is a professional degree in the study of criminal justice. The program is designed as a terminal degree for professionals in the field of criminal justice or as preparation for doctoral programs. It may also be referred to as a Master of Science in Justice Administration (M.S.J.A.).

== Cross-Cultural and International Education ==
This master's degree, offered by Bowling Green State University in Bowling Green, Ohio, prepares professional educators to be effective leaders in the internationalization of schools and communities and to be positive facilitators of cross-cultural understanding. Students complete the MACIE program with a capstone seminar or a master's thesis.

== Cultural Studies ==
This master's degree is a one or two year degree that allows students to engage the heterogeneous body of theories and practices associated with cultural studies and critical theory in the critical investigation of culture.

== Cyber Security ==
The Master of Information and Cybersecurity (MICS) is an interdisciplinary degree program that examines computer security technologies as well as human factors in information security, including the economic, legal, behavioral, and ethical impacts of the cybersecurity domain.

A Master of Science in Cyber Security is typically seated within the computer science discipline and is focused on the technical aspects of cybersecurity.

Other cybersecurity master's degree programs focus on policy and legal aspects of cybersecurity.

== Data Science ==
Master in Interdisciplinary Data Science, the University of Michigan School of Information's Master of Applied Data Science (MADS), and Master of Information and Data Science (MIDS) are professional graduate degrees in Data Science designed to help meet the need for knowledgeable data scientists who can answer important questions with data-backed insights, by drawing upon computer science, social sciences, statistics, management, and law.

== Dentistry ==
The Master of Science in Dentistry is a post-graduate degree awarded for those with a dental degree (BDS, DMD, DDS, BDent, BChD, etc.), who have completed a post-graduate level course of study.

== Digital Media ==
The Master of Digital Media is a professional degree in the study of digital media, which includes entertainment technology, and can be defined as media experiences made possible by the advent of primarily computer-mediated digital technologies (e.g., electronic games and special effects in motion pictures). This is also called the Master of Interactive Technology (MIT), which is offered at SMU Guildhall, or Master of Entertainment Technology (Carnegie Mellon).

== Dispute Resolution ==
Dispute Resolution as a master's degree program, a first in Australia, focuses on the wide range of non-adversarial dispute resolution processes. The subject accommodate distinct streams that include commerce, family, community and court-annexed programs. This subject is an introduction to the philosophy, theory and practice of an area of increasing importance in all professions, business and government. Dispute resolution processes are now integrated into the adversarial framework as well as being applied to an ever-widening range of private and public situations. This emerging practice of professional dispute resolution converge within and outside the legal profession.

== Divinity ==
The Master of Divinity (M.Div.) is the first professional degree in ministry (in the United States and Canada) and is a common academic degree among theological seminaries. It typically takes students three years to complete. Other theology degree titles used are Master of Theology (Th.M. or M.Th.), Master of Theological Studies (M.T.S.), Master of Arts in Practical Theology (M.A.P.T.), Master of Sacred Theology (S.T.M.) and Master of ecclesiastical Philosophy (M.EPh.).

== Education ==
Master of Education degrees are similar to MA, MS, and MSc, where the subject studied is education. In some states in the United States, teachers can earn teacher licensure with a bachelor's degree, but some states require a master's degree within a set number of years as continuing education. Other education-related master's degrees conferred in the United States are Master of Arts in Teaching (M.A.T.), Master of Science in Instruction (M.S.I.), Master of Science in education (M.S.Ed. or M.S.E.), Master of Arts in education (M.A.Ed.), Master of Adult Education (M.Ad. Ed.), and Master of Music Education (M.Mus.Ed.).

A Master of Education degree, or M.Ed., is a professional, graduate-level degree geared toward individuals who are seeking to move beyond the classroom into administrative-level positions or other specialized roles. It is generally not a degree leading to teaching at a college level, though it can very well prepare individuals for employment in higher education management and student personnel administration, as well as becoming adjunct college instructors. Many online M.Ed. programs offer a specialization in educational leadership. Over the past few years, however, the opportunity to specialize in educational technology has also become increasingly available. While many M.Ed. graduates seek to become principals and school district administrators, others become reading or technology specialists. The Master of Education degree is sometimes referred to as a practitioner's degree, because of its immediate and practical application to the school environment.

A Master of Arts in Education is perhaps the most flexible degree in the field, and often allows an educator to specialize in one of several concentrations. In addition to taking core classes in educational philosophy, child psychology, educational ethics, and education research methods, teachers pursuing this advanced education degree generally specialize in one of several fields.

Educational professionals who are looking to remain in the classroom often opt to pursue an online Master of Arts in education with a concentration in either elementary or secondary education. At many universities, a concentration in special education is also available. Individuals who are looking to leave the classroom often pursue concentrations in educational leadership, technology, or counseling. This list is by no means complete, as each university offers its own options for specialization.

Overall, the M.A. in Education includes more of the theoretical study of education than most of the other advanced degree options. The Master of Arts in Education also offers an extremely high level of flexibility, and can help to advance careers both inside and outside of the classroom.

While the other advanced degree programs tend to be more widely known, the Master of Science in Education can also provide professional educators with the tools needed for success in the classroom and advancement in educational leadership. As the name suggests, this degree program provides ample opportunity for the student to take a more scientific approach to the study of education. Many of those individuals who choose to follow the scientific route concentrate on topics like instructional technology or educational research.

In many instances, M.S. Education programs that take a scientific slant tend to include coursework in statistics and educational evaluation and measurement. Educators who pursue the more scientific path generally leave the classroom, and in many instances, the school. They have excellent job prospects in the educational research sector. Many go on to work with school districts, state governments, or private research organizations to assess student performance and suggest policies that will boost student achievement. Others supervise technology initiatives for schools or school districts, work in distance education, or pursue doctoral studies.

Other individuals who pursue an MS in Education opt for a less scientific course of study, such as educational leadership, or literacy. In some instances, these programs resemble the previously discussed Master of Education degree, but at other schools, these programs place a much greater focus on the scientific aspects of studying education. In either case, the same opportunities for advancement as a school administrator should be available, regardless of whether one has earned a degree of Master of Science in education, a Master of Arts in education, or a Master of Education.

== Educational Technology ==
The Association for Educational Communications and Technology (AECT) defines the field as "the study and ethical practice of facilitating learning and improving performance by creating, using and managing appropriate technological processes and resources.". Programs typically include courses on instructional design, learning theories, educational media, instructional messaging, related theory, and research methods. Some institutions use the term instructional technology to refer to their programs. Although some experts within the field distinguish between educational and instructional technology, on a practical level, the two are essentially synonymous.

Master's in Educational Technology programs are offered in at least one university in nearly every US state, and in many countries outside of the United States, including Australia, Canada, China, Singapore, South Korea, and Turkey.

One of the oldest programs in North America is based in the Department of Education at Concordia University in Montreal, Quebec, Canada, which has graduated approximately 2,000 master's degree and over 150 PhD students in its 50 years. Students can study full- or part-time, preparing to use their skills and knowledge to design curricula and programs, integrate technology, advise on educational technology policy, and conduct related research for schools, higher education, workplace learning, and community and informal learning.

The University of British Columbia (UBC) in Vancouver, British Columbia, Canada offers a part-time program within the Faculty of Education, focusing on curriculum design and technology integration.

The one-year professional Masters in Educational Technology and Applied Learning Science (METALS) is an interdisciplinary program offer by Carnegie Mellon University in Pittsburgh, Pennsylvania. It is jointly taught by the Human-Computer Interaction in the School of Computer Science and Psychology in Dietrich College of Humanities and Social Sciences. The program is an outgrowth of the research conducted by the National Science Foundation's Science of Learning Center, LearnLab, in which more than 200 researchers produced over 1600 publications and talks. METALS trains students to design, develop and evaluate evidenced-based programs for learning in settings that range from schools to homes, workplaces to museums, and online to offline learning environments. Students with backgrounds in psychology, education, computer science, design, information technology, or business are encouraged to apply.

== Electronic Business Technologies ==
The Master in Electronic Business Technologies (MEBT) is an interdisciplinary master's program offered at the University of Ottawa in Ontario, Canada.

== Engineering ==
The Master of Engineering (Magister in Ingeniaria) degree is awarded to students who have done graduate work at the master's level in the field of engineering. In the United States, engineering candidates are typically awarded MS degrees, although a growing number of schools also offer an MEng (e.g. the University of California, Berkeley). The distinction between the two programs varies between schools, but the MS is largely considered an academic degree, whereas the MEng is a professional degree. In the UK and Canada, candidates are generally awarded MSc, MASc or MEng degrees.

In Canada, the Master of Applied Science (MASc) is awarded to master's degree students with a research focus (having completed work leading to a thesis), while an MEng is awarded to master's degree students with a coursework focus and the completion of a research paper. The distinction between MASc and MEng is not definite since some universities grant only an MEng and some universities grant only an MASc, be it either research or coursework-focused.

In Francophone universities, the Master's Degree is referred to as a Maîtrise. The Master of Applied Science translates to Maîtrise des sciences appliquées and is abbreviated MScA. The Maîtrise in Canada is not equivalent to the Maîtrise in France, nor is the Baccalauréat. Canadian French-language degree and title nomenclature are consistent to North American custom. The MEng title translates to MIng, though this title cannot be used in one's signature in Québec (nor can BIng), as the title ing. (equivalent of P.Eng. in other provinces) is reserved for members of the provincial board of engineers, the Ordre des ingénieurs du Québec.

The Master of Science in Engineering is a post-graduate degree to be differentiated from the Master of Engineering. It requires a thesis and qualifies students holding it to apply for a Doctor of Philosophy (PhD) in Engineering.

== Environment ==
The Master of Environment (MEnv) is available at Concordia University, the Université de Sherbrooke, and the University of Colorado Boulder. The Master of Environmental Science (MEnvSc) is offered at University of Toronto Scarborough.

== Environmental Management ==
The Master of Environmental Science and Management (MESM) is offered by UC Santa Barbara. The Master of Land and Water Systems is available at the University of British Columbia.

== Finance ==
The Master of Science in Finance is a common degree in the corporate finance and investment finance world. It is considered the financial service industry's answer to accounting's Master of Accountatcny (MAcc) degree.

== Fine Arts ==
The Master of Fine Arts (M.F.A.) is a two to three-year terminal degree in a creative field of study, such as theatre arts, creative writing, filmmaking, or studio art.

== Foreign Service ==
The Master of Science in Foreign Service (MSFS) is a two-year degree program offered by Georgetown University's Edmund A. Walsh School of Foreign Service. Established in 1922, it is the first international relations graduate program in the United States. The 48-credit multidisciplinary curriculum emphasizes both theory and practice to educate international affairs professionals in the public, private, and non-profit sectors. Foundational courses in international relations, economics, and history are complemented by specialized courses in students’ areas of concentration: international development, politics and security, science and technology, global business and finance. In addition to course requirements, the degree requires successful passing of the oral examination, proficiency in a foreign language, and completion of an internship and leadership requirements.

== Forensic Science ==
The Master of Forensic Sciences (MFS) is a specialized professional degree designed for law enforcement, lab personnel, attorneys, investigators and other professionals. The Master of Science in Forensic Science is offered by John Jay College of Criminal Justice at City University of New York.

The Master of Science in Forensic Science and Law is a degree program available at Duquesne University. It combines all applications of forensic science with law and its application and legal use before a court of law.

Universities offering degree programs in this field have applied for accreditation from the American Academy of Forensic Sciences (AAFS)'s Forensic Science Education Programs Accreditation Commission.

== Forestry ==
The Master of Forestry (MF) degree is offered by Yale School of the Environment. The two-year MF degree is accredited by the Society of American Foresters (SAF) and prepares students for careers in sustainable natural resource management and policy. The curriculum is divided into three stages and focuses on the complex relationships among the science, management, and policy of forest resources. Students are also required to complete a summer internship and a capstone.

A similar 48-credit MF degree at Duke University's Nicholas School of the Environment is also accredited by the SAF and can be pursued on its own or concurrently with the Master of Environmental Management (MEM) degree or with degrees from other professional schools at Duke and the University of North Carolina at Chapel Hill.

== Global Affairs ==
The Master of Science in Global Affairs is a degree program available at New York University. The 42-credit curriculum is designed to help students unravel the complex relationships between nations and key international factors and make sense of world events. Coursework covers subjects ranging from economic globalization and the issues facing developing countries to conflict resolution and international law.

The Master of Global Affairs (MGA) is a two-year professional degree offered by the Munk School within the University of Toronto. The interdisciplinary degree aims to equip students with an awareness of global financial systems, global civil society, and global governance to prepare students for strategic thinking and responsible leadership on global issues.

The Master's of Arts in Global Governance (MAGG) offered by the Balsillie School of International Affairs designed to be completed in 16 months, consists of two terms of course work, a third term in which students complete a major research paper, followed by a fourth term as an intern working on global governance issues in the public or private sector, a research institute, or NGO. The selection process for the MAGG is highly competitive and only 15-18 students are admitted per year.

A Master of Global Affairs program is offered at the University of Notre Dame, Rice University, and the University of Toronto.

== Health Administration ==
Master of Health Administration (MHA) is a two-year degree similar to an MBA but instead is focused on health care systems rather than businesses in general.

== Health Science ==
The Master of Health Science is awarded to students who have completed a post-graduate course of study in health sciences or health policy fields, usually associated with the Public Health field. The MHS is often a more focused program for public health professionals, often with non-health professional backgrounds. This degree is abbreviated as MHSc in Canada. New degree programs in the US, include MSHS (Master of Science in Health Sciences) that relate to this same particular program type are also becoming more common as universities and medical schools develop more degree specialties throughout the US.

== Historic Preservation ==
The Master of Science in Historic Preservation (MSHP) is a graduate degree, often offered through schools and colleges of architecture, which focuses on the theory and practical elements of preserving buildings of historic importance. There are only a few programs in the United States, but all of the programs tend to focus on architectural conservation, design, history/theory, preservation planning, building analysis, and preservation law.

The Master of Arts in Historic Preservation provides training in the research, documentation, and preservation of the historic built environment. Typically the MAHP is differentiated from the Master of Historic Preservation MHP by an emphasis on historic research and writing, and is usually housed in history departments.

== Historic Preservation ==
The Master of Historic Preservation (MHP) is a two to two and a half year degree in the field of historic preservation. The MHP is usually considered a terminal degree, although a few Phd programs exist offering historic preservation as a concentration within another field such as community planning. Commonly MHP programs are housed in history, planning, or architecture departments. Interdisciplinary by nature, MHP programs typically consist of courses in architectural history, history and theory of preservation practice, cultural landscape preservation, historic resource documentation and evaluation, community planning, and rehabilitation philosophy and practice.

== History ==
The Master of Arts in History

== Human-Computer Interaction ==
The Master of Human-computer interaction is a professional degree that focuses on the training and research around topics related to human-computer interaction (HCI). Human-computer interaction, while touches upon areas of research covered by computer science, psychology, cognitive science, social sciences, design, media and other fields of studies, is often categorized under the department of computer science or information science. And students who pursue their graduate studies in this area usually receive a degree of master of computer science or master of information science.

There is a limit amount of institutions that offer a master's degree directly under HCI. The Master of human-computer interaction (MHCI), a program at Carnegie Mellon University offered by the Human-Computer Interaction Institute (HCII), is the first program that is solely focused on professional training for students who wish to pursue a career in human-computer interaction related area. There are similar programs offered by other institution, such as Master of Human-Computer Interaction and Design (MHCI+D) by University of Washington, Master of Science in Human-Computer Interaction (MS in HCI) by Georgia Tech, and Master of Science in HCI by Indiana University, Bloomington. These programs often consist of academic learning experiences in research and design and industry training in client relation and project management. Students are usually expected to gain a professional proficiency for HCI related topics in an industry setting.

== Human Factors ==
The Master of Science in Human Factors (MSHF) degree focuses on human factors and ergonomics in systems and processes.

== Humanities ==
The Master of Arts in Humanities degree requires two years in an accredited college.

== Industrial and Labor Relations ==
Industrial and Labor Relations.

== Industrial Design ==
Master of Industrial Design is a two- or three-year program in the field of industrial design.

The MID acronym is also used for a Master of International Development, which is a postgraduate degree in the study of developmental economics, non-governmental organizations and civil society, development planning, environmental sustainability, and human security.

== Information ==
The Master of Science in Information (MSI) is a graduate degree designed for information science professionals.

== Information Management ==
The Master of Science in Information Management (MSIM) is a graduate degree designed for information management professionals.

== Information Systems ==
The Master of Science in Information Systems (MSIS) is a graduate degree designed for information systems professionals. The Master of Information Systems (MIS or MSIS) is a 2-year degree geared towards professionals trained in both management and information systems. The culmination of both fields is often referred to as management information systems. The Master of Information Systems is sometimes extended with additional courses such as those focused on management (MISM or MIS\M), or information security (MISIS, MIS\IS).

== Information Technology ==
The Master of Science in Information Technology is a graduate degree designed for information technology professionals. It is generally based on core computer science subjects where knowledge can be used for advanced work, especially in Information Technology industry. Whereas the Bachelor level degree provides a well-balanced foundation in Information Technology, the Master's degree allows the student not only further advancement of core knowledge, but also an opportunity to specialize in selected technology areas of interest. The Master of Information Technology is one of the most sought degrees in the field of Computer Science and Information Technology and is much sought after by employers in the Information Technology marketplace. This degree ensures that the person who has attained this degree is competent in all key areas of Information Technology sector and has further advanced this with specialized knowledge, research, and publications.

== Interactive Media ==
The Master of Science in Interactive Media is a graduate degree offered by Quinnipiac University in Hamden, Connecticut. Through a balance of courses in interactive theory, media production, programming, Web design, and animation, students learn how to transform traditional media and original content into multimedia productions. The combination of study in the intellectual and production aspects of interactive media creates students that are innovative thinkers who understand the shift from legacy media to online.

== International Business ==
The Master of International Business (MIB) degree is a postgraduate degree designed to develop the capabilities and resources of managers in the global economy. It is ideal for those seeking to establish or accelerate a career in international business.

Emphasizing the practical application of specialized knowledge, the program equips management with skills tailored to the international business environment.

The Master of International Business focuses on strategic planning for international operations and provides an in-depth understanding of the organizational capabilities required for international operations, including specialized functions such as international marketing, finance and human resource management.

The degree may be thought of as an MBA with a particular focus on multinational corporations.

== International Development ==
The MID acronym is also used for a Master of International Development, which is a postgraduate degree in the study of developmental economics, non-governmental organizations and civil society, development planning, environmental sustainability, and human security.

== International Economics and Finance ==
The Master of Arts in international economics and finance is a two-year degree in the field of economics.

== International Hotel Management ==
The Master of Arts in International Hotel Management is a two-year professional graduate degree awarded by Royal Roads University [1] that prepares individuals to succeed in senior and executive hospitality positions within the accommodations sector including hotels, resorts, and cruise ships. RRU delivers this 39 credit program through a combination of 15 credits during three-short term residences (two in Victoria, BC Canada and one in an international location), and 24 credits through on-line distance learning.

== Internet Technology ==
Internet Technology degrees are available online and on campus. The Internet Technology MS degree at The Seidenberg School of Computer Science and Information Systems at Pace University consists of a 12-credit foundational core, followed by a 12-credit concentration in E-Commerce or Security and Information Assurance. There are other programs available at other Universities in the United States.

== Jurisprudence ==
Master of Jurisprudence (M.J.) is sometimes used as an alternative name for both Master of Laws and Master of Juridical Science. Offered within United States law schools, students of an M.J. curriculum are often business professionals and/or Juris Doctor degree holders; who wish to enhance their knowledge in a specialized field of law. A Master of Jurisprudence is highly beneficial for those that need an in-depth understanding of the law within current executive level positions.M.J. students are required to develop a comprehensive understanding of the operation of law as it applies to a specified area of law. An M.J. program combines a combination of graduate level legal courses with MBA-style courses in concentrated areas of study. Master of Jurisprudence program offerings include but aren't limited to degrees in Business and Corporate Governance Law, Health Law and Policy, and Child and Family Law. The M.J. program is typically 24 credit hours and can be completed in two years; or longer depending on the law student's enrollment status.l

== Landscape Architecture ==
The Master of Landscape Architecture (MLA) degree is a professional degree in the field of landscape architecture.

== Laws ==
Master of Laws (LL.M.) is an advanced degree in law, pursued after earning a first degree in law within the U.S. or abroad, such as a Juris Doctor (J.D.). The LL.M. program typically lasts one year if taken full-time. For foreign law graduates, the LL.M. is similar to a 'study abroad program' and offers a general overview of the American Legal System. Domestic U.S. law graduates pursue the LL.M. for different reasons, largely academic. With the exception of LL.M. programs in highly specialized areas where advanced knowledge in a field is useful (e.g., Taxation, International Taxation, Intellectual Property; etc.), the Master of Laws is designed for those intending to teach law, whereas the J.D. is a professional doctorate.

== Leadership ==
The Master of Science in Leadership is an alternative to, not a substitute for, the traditional Master of Business Administration (MBA) degree. The MSL degree requirements may include some business courses that are required in an MBA program. However, this degree program concentrates heavily on leader-follower interactions, cross-cultural communications, coaching, team development, project leadership, and behavioral motivation theories; it does not concentrate on financial or quantitative analysis, marketing, or accounting which are common in MBA programs. The degree program is appealing to people in well-established careers already. The MSL degree is similar to the Master of Organizational Leadership (MSOL) degree.

== Liberal Studies ==
The Master of Arts in Liberal Studies (MALS) Master of Liberal Arts (MLA, ALM) and Master of Liberal Studies (MLS) are interdisciplinary master's degrees. Characteristics that distinguish these degrees from others include curricular flexibility, interdisciplinary synthesis via Master's thesis or capstone project, and optional part-time enrollment.

== Library Science ==
A Master of Library Science (MLS) degree is the culmination of an interdisciplinary program encompassing information science, information management, librarianship, archival, among other skills needed in varying fields of libraries and archives. An MLS (or equivalent name), is required in 19 states to become a librarian, and many institutions can individually require the degree outside of a state level, such as the Los Angeles Public Library. Modern variants include Master of Library and Information Studies (MLIS), Master of Science in Information Studies (MSIS), Master of Librarianship, Master of Information Management and Systems (MIMS), Master of Science in Library Science (MSLS), among others. There are 64 ALA accredited schools across the United States (including Puerto Rico), United Kingdom, and Canada.

== Logistics, Trade, and Transportation ==
The Master of Science in logistics, Trade, and Transportation (MS LTT) at the University of Southern Mississippi is an interdisciplinary program of 30 total credit hours. This LTT program can be completed in one year and customized to meet career advancement needs. The MS LTT program comprises logistics, supply chain management, global trade and economic development, business, and other courses.

== Management ==
The Master of Arts in management (MAM), in the United States, is a professional graduate degree that prepares business professionals for senior level management positions and executive leadership of organizations and corporations (for-profit, nonprofit and public sector). The business MAM degree should not be confused with Master's degrees in Arts Management, which may be more numerous in the U.S.. The MAM degree is a specialized degree that focuses studies on all areas of business, e.g., strategic planning and leadership, marketing analysis and strategy, operations management, project management, human resource management, organizational design and development, finance, accounting, management and contract negotiations, statistical methods and applications, economic theory, and research.

A characteristic that tends to distinguish the MAM and MBA business degrees from other Master's degrees in business is the absence of in-depth study within one particular area of business. M.S. business degrees typically focus on traditional areas like Finance, Accounting, and Information Systems. The MAM student's courses cover advanced management and strategic leadership as they apply to all areas of business, e.g., accounting, finance, operations management marketing, strategic planning, and human resources. The MAM student "masters the art of management." MBA and MAM degrees are both Master's level business degrees that cover broad and general content.

Master of Science programs in Management involve course work focusing within one areas of business such as Management Information Systems, Finance, Accounting and other areas.

== Management in the Network Economy ==
Management in the Network Economy is a one- or two-year interdisciplinary post-graduate program that uniquely blends information economics, technology management and business administration, in order to forge leaders able to understand and manage the complexity of organizations and markets in the digital economy. In certain universities, like the Catholic University in Italy, this Master encompasses typical courses of a Master of Information Systems Management (MISM or MIS/M) and the business knowledge you can gain from a Master of Business Administration (MBA) or a Master of Business and Organizational Leadership (MBOL).

== Mathematics ==
Either pure or applied. Usually an MA, sometimes an MS.

== Marketing and Communication ==
The Master of Science in Marketing and Communication (MCM) is an integrated marketing communication graduate degree offered at Franklin University in Columbus, Ohio.

The Master of Science in Integrated Marketing Communications (IMC) is graduate degree offered at West Virginia University in Morgantown, WV through WVU's Reed College of Media.

== Marketing Research ==
Master of Marketing Research (MMR) is a specialized degree in marketing focusing in research. Sometimes called a Master of Science in Marketing Research (MSMR).

== Mass Communication ==
The Master of Mass Communications is a two- to three-year degree in the field of journalism and mass communications that prepares degree candidates for careers in media management. Students typically undertake courses in media law, marketing, integrated communications, research methods, and management.

== Medical Education ==
The Masters of Science in Medical Education prepares physicians for careers as academic Clinician-Educator-Scholars through didactic training in medical education and research methods, and mentored education research.

== Medical Science ==
Medical Science is a two-year postgraduate degree in medical research, usually for those possessing a Doctorate of Medicine already.

== Ministry ==
The Master of Ministry is a two- to three-year multidisciplinary degree with a program typically designed to apply appropriate theological principles to practice-based settings and serve as a foundation for an original research project. Such a program responds to the need for structured learning and theological development among professionals serving Church, non-profit, public, and private sector organizations.

Typical concentrations (or majors) include: Missions, evangelism, pastoral counseling, chaplaincy, church growth and development, Christian administration, homiletics, spiritual formation, pastoral theology, Church administration, Biblical counseling, clergy, Biblical archeology, religious education, Christian management, church music, social work, spiritual direction.

== Music ==
Master of Music, usually abbreviated M.Mus. or M.M., is one to two year graduate degree that combines advanced studies in an applied area of specialization (usually music performance, composition, or conducting) with graduate-level academic study in subjects such as music history, music theory, or music pedagogy. The degree, which takes one or two years of full-time study to complete, prepares students to be professional performers, conductors, and composers. The degree is often required as the minimum teaching credential for university, college, and conservatory instrumental or vocal teaching positions. Other related degrees include the Master of Music Education (M.Mus.Ed.), Master of Arts in Music Education (M.A.), Master of Sacred Music (M.S.M.), and Master of Worship Studies (M.W.S.).

== Natural Resources ==
The Master of Natural Resources (MNR) program is a graduate degree program designed for natural resource instructors and practitioners. The program, offered remotely and in person from several institutions, focuses on several aspects of natural resource policy, management, and assessment. MNR degrees often do not include a thesis, instead opting for 30-35 credits of courses taught by industry professionals and research professors.

== Natural Sciences ==
The Master of Science in Natural Sciences (MSNS) program is a graduate degree program designed for elementary, middle and high school science teachers, stressing content and the processes of natural sciences.

== Nonprofit Management ==
Master of Nonprofit Organizations (MNPO or MNO) and Master of Nonprofit Management (MNM) programs offer specialized, graduate-level knowledge for individuals currently working in the nonprofit sector or in organizations that partner with the nonprofit sector or for those seeking a career in the nonprofit sector. The program provides advanced knowledge in nonprofit management, resource development, strategic planning, and program evaluation that serves to enhance the education and career development of students. This degree program provides opportunities for students to prepare for employment or to advance their careers as administrators in nonprofit organizations. MNPO, MNO, and MNM programs are offered through a range of academic units, including schools and departments of social work, business, management, public administration, and independent units.

== Nonprofit Organizations ==
Master of Nonprofit Organizations (MNPO or MNO) and Master of Nonprofit Management (MNM) programs offer specialized, graduate-level knowledge for individuals currently working in the nonprofit sector or in organizations that partner with the nonprofit sector or for those seeking a career in the nonprofit sector. The program provides advanced knowledge in nonprofit management, resource development, strategic planning, and program evaluation that serves to enhance the education and career development of students. This degree program provides opportunities for students to prepare for employment or to advance their careers as administrators in nonprofit organizations. MNPO, MNO, and MNM programs are offered through a range of academic units, including schools and departments of social work, business, management, public administration, and independent units.

== Nurse Anesthesia ==
The Master of Science in Nurse Anesthesia degree prepares students to master the intellectual and technical skills required to become competent in the safe administration of anesthesia.

== Nursing ==
The Master of Science in Nursing (MSN) is the most common title for a graduate professional degree in nursing. A few schools also use the titles Master of Nursing or Master of Arts. Admittance into a MSN program requires that the professional be a registered nurse (RN), have an up-to-date license, and to have successfully completed a Bachelor of Science in Nursing (BSN) degree program. A full-time student can expect to complete the degree program in 18 to 24 months. A part-time student could take anywhere from 3 to 5 years to complete a MSN program.

Completion of a MSN/NP program earns nursing professionals the title of Nurse Practitioner (NP). While registered nurses administer medication and perform basic diagnostic tests, nurse practitioner's order and analyze the diagnostic tests, as well as prescribe treatments. Nurse Practitioner's entry level salary is typically $20,000 more than a Registered Nurse will earn.

== Occupational Therapy ==
The Master of Occupational Therapy is awarded to students who have completed a post-graduate course of study, and is now the entry-level degree for this profession. This degree is sometimes also conferred as a Master of Science in Occupational Therapy.

== Organizational Leadership ==
MSOL is a multi-disciplinary masters program that focuses on values-based leadership. The courses focus on the development of relationships between organizational members, effective decision-making processes, and an understanding of how modern technology can best support leaders. The MSOL degree is an alternative, not a substitute for an MBA. The programs are different in content and purpose. The MSOL degree is multidisciplinary and focuses more on people and organization issues, less on business topics such as finance, accounting and marketing. For example, in MSOL you will take courses in psychology and philosophy as well as courses in business and management. The MSOL degree is intended for those who are already established in a career. In contrast, those who are preparing to enter the world of work or change careers often seek an MBA degree. Although the MBA degree is more widely known, degree programs like the MSOL are being developed across the country because of increasing demand for ethical organizational leadership.

== Pacific International Affairs ==
The Master of Pacific International Affairs degree is a professional master's degree that provides training in various aspects of international affairs including International Business Management, International Politics, Public Policy, International Environmental Policy and Development and Non-Profit Management. The program requires mastery in a Pacific Rim language, quantitative and economic analysis techniques and a regional focus.

== Pharmacy ==
The Master of Pharmacy degree is awarded to students who have completed the four-year undergraduate Pharmacy course. Failure to complete the course, but having completed three years, usually awards the student a bachelor's degree in Pharmaceutical Science.

== Philosophy ==
In the United States and Canada, a Master of Philosophy or Magister Philosophiae (MPhil) degree is sometimes awarded to ABD (all but dissertation) doctoral candidates who have completed all coursework, passed their written and oral examinations, and met any other special requirements before beginning work on the doctoral dissertation. Such programs generally award the M.A. to students who have completed all coursework and preliminary exams (about two years after the B.A.), and the M.Phil. after advanced exams (comprehensives) and all language requirements have been met, and a dissertation topic approved (usually a year after the M.A.).

In other countries, assuming all requirements are met, the MPhil degree is generally awarded after about one year of full-time study towards a doctorate. The MPhil is considered equivalent to the former French DEA (Diplôme d'études approfondies) and Spanish DEA (Diploma de Estudios Avanzados).

== Physician Assistant Studies ==
The Master of Physician Assistant Studies is a professional degree providing training in the profession of a physician assistant to practice medicine based on the medical school model. This degree is also sometimes seen as an MS in Physician Assistant Studies (MSPAS), the Master of Physician Assistant Practice (MPAP)

== Professional Counseling ==
The Masters of Arts in Professional Counseling (MAPC) is a two-year program that prepares individuals for the independent professional practice of psychological counseling, involving the rendering of therapeutic services to individuals and groups experiencing psychological problems and exhibiting distress symptoms. Includes instruction in counseling theory, therapeutic intervention strategies, patient/counselor relationships, testing and assessment methods and procedures, group therapy, marital and family therapy, child and adolescent therapy, supervised counseling practice, ethical standards, and applicable regulations.

== Professional Studies ==
The Master's of Professional Studies (MPS or MProfStuds) is a terminal interdisciplinary degree and is sometimes used by programs that do not fit into any traditional categories. In some cases it is used as replacement for an MFA for programs with heavy technology focuses like NYU's Interactive Telecommunications Program. Other programs use it for Organizational Studies or interdisciplinary Social Science programs.

== Professional Writing ==
The Master of Professional Writing (MPW) degree is a professional graduate degree program that prepares candidates for a wide variety of writing-related positions in business, education, publishing, and the arts. Coursework in three concentrations - applied writing, composition and rhetoric, and creative writing - allows students to gain theoretical and practical knowledge in various fields of professional writing.

== Project Management ==
The Master of Project Management is a terminal professional degree awarded to students who have completed a post-graduate course of study, and is usually associated with construction management, urban planning, or architecture and engineering design management. There are a limited number of universities and schools worldwide to be accredited by the Global Accreditation Center of the Project Management Institute® PMI, they must meet the standards of the leading association for project management professionals.

== Public Administration ==
The Master of Public Administration (M.P.A. or MPA; MAP in Québec) degree is one of several Master's level professional public affairs degrees that provides training in public policy and project and program implementation (more recently known as public management).

MPA programs focus on public administration at the local, state/provincial, national/federal and supranational levels, as well as in the nongovernmental organization (NGO) and nonprofit sectors. In the course of its history the MPA degree has become more interdisciplinary by drawing from fields such as economics, sociology, anthropology, political science, and regional planning in order to equip MPA graduates with skills and knowledge covering a broad range of topics and disciplines relevant to the public sector. A core curriculum of a typical MPA program usually includes courses on microeconomics, public finance, research methods / statistics, policy process and policy analysis, ethics, public management, leadership, planning & GIS, and program evaluation/performance measurement. Depending on their interest, MPA students can focus their studies on a variety of public sector fields such as urban planning, emergency management, transportation, health care (particularly public health), economic development, urban management, community development, education, non-profits, information technology, environmental policy, etc.

== Public health ==
The Master of Public Health and Master of Science in Public Health degrees are awarded to students who have completed a "post-graduate course" of study in Public Health. The MPH is considered a management/leadership degree specific to the fields related to public health while the MSPH is considered an academic degree, with a focus on empirical research methodologies.

== Public Management ==
The Master of Public Management is offered through Carnegie Mellon University Heinz College. This masters level degree is conferred upon those students who have completed a post-graduate course of study, and is usually associated with broadening the students' understanding of social, political, technological and economic processes, as well as paradigms of organizational and human behavior.

== Public Policy ==
The Master of Public Policy is a master level professional degree that provides training in policy analysis and program evaluation at public policy schools. Over time, the curriculum of Master of Public Policy and the Master of Public Administration (M.P.A.) degrees have blended and converged, due to the realization that policy analysis and program evaluation could benefit from an understanding of public administration, and vice versa. However, MPP programs still place more emphasis in policy analysis, research and evaluation, while MPA programs place more emphasis on operationalization of public policies and the design of effective programs and projects to achieve public policy goals. Over the years MPP programs have become more interdisciplinary drawing from economics, sociology, anthropology, politics, and regional planning. Depending on the interest, MPP students can concentrate in many policy areas including, but not limited to, urban policy, global policy, social policy, health policy, non-profit management, transportation, economic development, education, information technology, etc. Students interested in pursuing a degree program focused entirely on global public policy can also consider Master of Public Policy and Global Affairs (M.P.P.G.A) programs.

== Public Service ==
The Master of Arts in Public Service (MAPS) degree is a professional graduate degree program which offers specializations in areas of administration of justice, dispute resolution, health care administration, leadership studies, and non-profit studies.

== Quality Assurance ==
The Master of Science in Quality Assurance (MSQA) is a graduate degree designed for quality management professionals in diverse industries including service, manufacturing, software, government and health care organizations.

== Resource Management ==
The Masters of Resource Management (M.R.M.) is designed for recent graduates from a range of disciplines, and for individuals with experience in private organizations or public agencies dealing with natural resources and the environment. Relevant disciplines of undergraduate training or experience include fields such as biology, engineering, chemistry, forestry and geology, as well as business administration, economics, geography, planning and a variety of social sciences. The M.R.M. degree provides training for professional careers in private or public organizations and preparation for further training for research and academic careers.

== Sacred Music ==
The Master of Sacred Music is a graduate degree combining academic studies in theology with applied studies in music.

== Security Technologies ==
Master of Science in Security Technologies (MSST) is a 32 credit, thesis graduate program for security as it relates to technology, intelligence collection, policy, law, cyber and physical security management, and security methodology. The program is within the College of Science and Engineering at the University of Minnesota.

== Social Work ==
The Master of Social Work (MSW) is a professional graduate degree preparing students to become professional social workers, typically in either direct practice or community practice. MSW programs require students to complete an extensive field practicum, under mentorship of a senior social worker. MSW programs in the United States are accredited by the Council on Social Work Education.

The degree title MSW is not used in the US by all social work schools. The University of Chicago uses A.M. and Columbia University uses M.S. to name a few of the exceptions.

== Strategic Leadership ==
The Master of Science in Strategic Leadership (MSSL) graduate degree is an Executive Program in Organizational Leadership and Management Development, teaching the skills and knowledge in working effectively with people, organizational systems, and complex information. MSSL objectives embody development of a leadership skill set, strategies for problem solving, and solutions to facilitate and manage change applicable in business and not-for-profit environments.

== Taxation ==
The Master of Science in Taxation (MST) is a professional graduate degree designed for Certified Public Accountants (CPAs) and other tax professionals.

== Teaching ==
Coursework and practice leading to a Master of Arts in Teaching (MAT) degree is intended to prepare individuals for a teaching career in a specific subject of middle and/or secondary-level curricula (i.e., middle or high school). The MAT differs from the MEd degree in that the course requirements are dominated by classes in the subject area to be taught (e.g., foreign language, math, science, etc.) rather than educational theory; and that the MAT candidate does not already hold a teaching credential whereas the MEd candidate will. The MAT often is the initial teacher education program for those who hold a bachelor's degree in the subject that they intend to teach. Work toward most MAT degrees will, however, necessarily include classes on educational theory in order to meet program and state requirements. Work toward the MAT degree may also include practica (i.e., student teaching). This abbreviation is also sometimes used to refer to a Master's in Theology (see ThM).

The Master of Arts in Teaching, or MAT, differs from the M.Ed. and the other Master's degrees in education primarily in that the majority of coursework focuses on the subject to be taught (i.e. history, English, math, biology, etc.) rather than on educational theory. While some online MAT programs offer a more general overview of the foundations of effective teaching, most MAT programs combine the study of widely established ‘best practices’ in the classroom with a focus on teaching within a specific discipline. Either way, the MA in Teaching is truly a teaching degree. Individuals who pursue the Master of Arts in Teaching generally choose to remain in the classroom. An MAT can also provide an educator with the appropriate credentials to become a department chairperson.

== Theology ==
The Master of Divinity (M.Div.) is the first professional degree in ministry (in the United States and Canada) and is a common academic degree among theological seminaries. It is typically three years in length. Other theology degree titles used are Master of Theology (Th.M. or M.Th.), Master of Theological Studies (M.T.S.), Master of Arts in Practical Theology (M.A.P.T.), and Master of Sacred Theology (S.T.M.).

== Urban Planning ==
The Master of Urban Planning (MUP), Master of City and Regional Planning (MCRP), Master of Urban and Regional Planning (MURP), Master of Environmental Design (MEDes (planning)) and Master of City Planning (MCP) are professional degrees in the study of urban planning.

== Urban Studies ==
The degree is primarily focused on urban issues including planning issues.
