= Bachelor of Science in Information Technology =

Bachelor's degree program

A Bachelor of Science in Information Technology (abbreviated BSIT or B.Sc. IT) is a bachelor's degree awarded for an undergraduate program in information technology. The degree is normally required in order to work in the information technology industry.

A Bachelor of Science in Information Technology (B.Sc. IT) degree program typically takes three to four years depending on the country. This degree is primarily focused on subjects such as software, databases, and networking.

The degree is a Bachelor of Science degree with institutions conferring degrees in the fields of information technology and related fields. This degree is awarded for completing a program of study in the field of software development, software testing, software engineering, web design, databases, programming, computer networking and computer systems.

Graduates with an information technology background are able to perform technology tasks relating to the processing, storing, and communication of information between computers, mobile phones, and other electronic devices. Information technology as a field emphasizes the secure management of large amounts of variable information and its accessibility via a wide variety of systems both local and worldwide.

== Skills taught ==
Generally, software and information technology companies look for people who have strong programming skills, system analysis, and software testing skills.

Many colleges teach practical skills that are crucial to becoming a software developer. As logical reasoning and critical thinking are important in becoming a software professional, this degree encompasses the complete process of software development from software design and development to final testing.

Students who complete their undergraduate education in software engineering at a satisfactory level often pursue graduate studies such as a Master of Science in Information Technology (M.Sc. IT) and sometimes continuing onto a doctoral program and earning a doctorate such as a Doctor of Information Technology (DIT).

== International variations ==
=== Bangladesh ===
In Bangladesh, the Bachelor of Engineering in Information Technology is awarded following a four-year course of study under the Dhaka University, Jahangirnagar University, Bangladesh University of Professionals, University of Information Technology and Sciences.

=== India ===
In India an engineering degree in Information Technology is 4 year academic program equivalent to Computer Science&Engineering because in the first year basic engineering subjects and Calculus are taught and in the succeeding years core computer science topics are taught in both B.Tech-IT and B.Tech-CSE.

=== Nepal ===
In Nepal, Bachelor of Science in Computer Science and Information Technology (B.Sc.CSIT ) is a four-year course of study. The Bachelor of Computer Science and Information Technology is provided by Tribhuvan University and the degree awarded is referred to as BSc.CSIT.

=== Philippines ===
In the Philippines, BSIT program normally takes 4 years to complete. Schools with trimester system has less time to complete this course. A total number of 486 hours was set by the CHED during internships of the program.

=== Thailand ===
In Thailand, the Bachelor of Science in Information Technology (BS IT) is a four-year undergraduate degree program which is a subject of accreditation by the Office of the Higher Education Commission (OHEC) and the Office for National Education Standards and Quality Assessment (ONESQA) of the Ministry of Higher Education, Science, Research and Innovation (MHESI).

The first international BS IT program, using English as a medium of instruction (EMI), has been established in 1990 at the Faculty of Science and Technology (renamed in 2013 to Vincent Mary School of Science and Technology (VMS)), Assumption University of Thailand (AU). The 2019 BS IT curriculum has been updated by VMS to respond to the discovery of the students' potential and also blended with marketing communications needs.

=== United States ===
In the United States, a B.S. in Information Technology is awarded after a four-year course of study. Some degree programs are accredited by the Computing Accreditation Commission of the Accreditation Board for Engineering and Technology (ABET).

=== United Arab Emirates ===
In UAE, Skyline University College offers 4 years Bachelor of Science in Information Technology enterprise computing.

Ajman University's Bachelor of Science in Information Technology programme provides students with a comprehensive understanding of computer science and technology, preparing them for careers in the Information Technology sector.

=== Kenya ===
In Kenya, the Bachelor of Science in Information Technology (BS IT) is a four-year undergraduate degree program which is a subject of accreditation by the Commission for University Education (CUE). In Kenya, the Bachelor of Science in Information Technology is awarded following a four-year course of study at institutions such as the University of Nairobi, Meru University of Science and Technology, Moi University, and Dedan Kimathi University of Technology.

== See also ==
- Bachelor of Computing
- Bachelor of Information Technology
- Bachelor of Computer Science
- Bachelor of Software Engineering
- Bachelor of Information technology management
- Bachelor of Computer Information Systems
