= Master of Science =

Type of postgraduate qualification

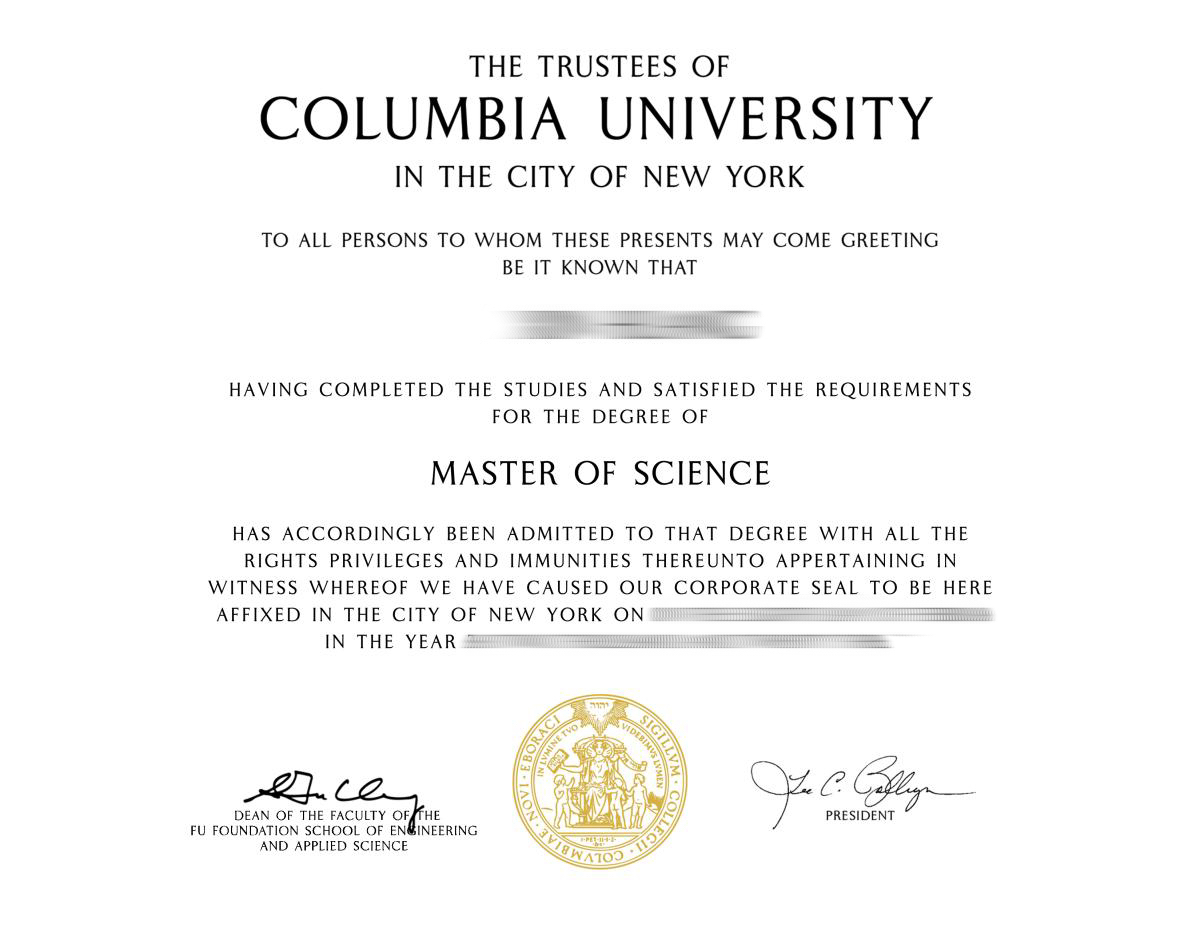
Columbia University's Master of Science diploma

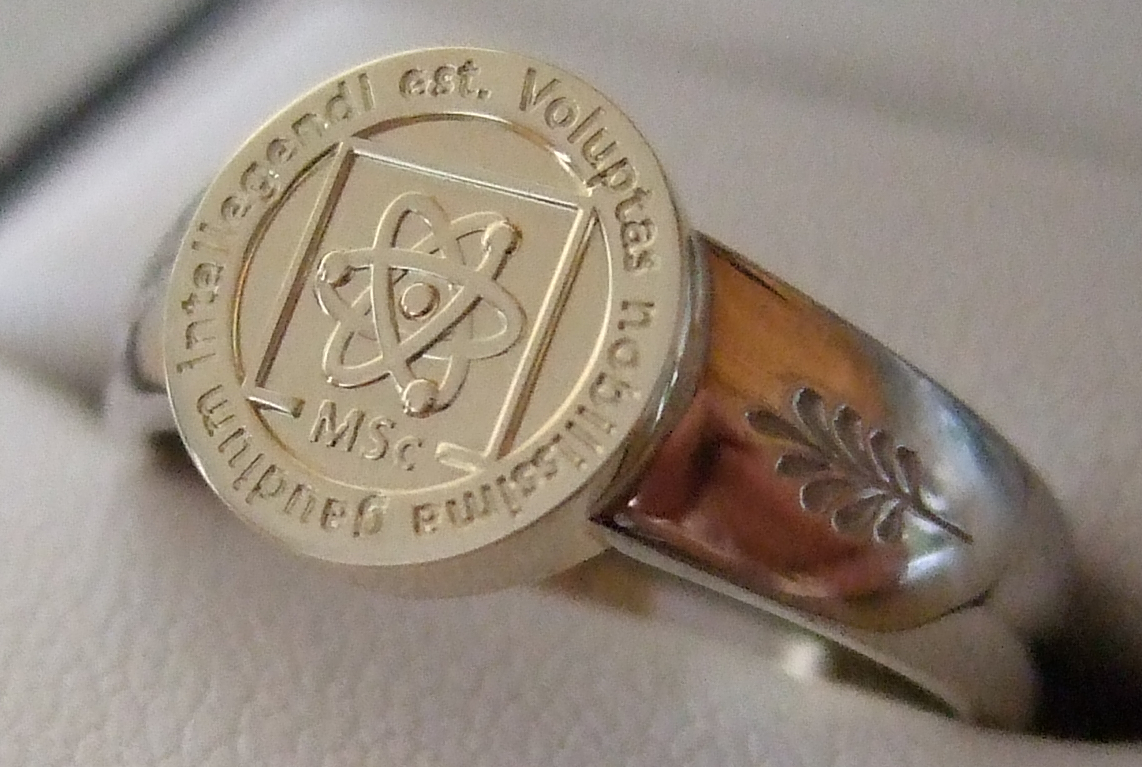
A graduation ring with the Master of Science designation

A Master of Science (Latin: Magister Scientiae), abbreviated as MS, MSc, MSci, SM, or ScM, is a master's degree. It usually focuses on developing advanced knowledge and analytical skills within a specific scientific, technical, or professional field. It typically emphasizes research, quantitative methods, and critical thinking, combining theoretical foundations with practical application to prepare graduates for specialized careers, doctoral study, or professional advancement.

The Master of Science degree was introduced and first awarded by the University of Michigan in 1858.

== Algeria ==
Algeria follows the Bologna Process.

== Australia ==
Australian universities commonly have coursework or research-based Master of Science courses for graduate students. They typically run for 1–2 years full-time, with varying amounts of research involved.

== Bangladesh ==
All Bangladeshi private and public universities have Master of Science courses as postgraduate degree. These include most of the major state-owned colleges. A number of private colleges also do offer MS degrees. After passing Bachelor of Science, any student becomes eligible to study in this discipline.

== Belgium ==
Like all EU member states, Belgium follows the Bologna Process. In Belgium, the typical university track involved obtaining two degrees, being a two-year Kandidaat prerequisite track (replaced by Bachelor) followed by a two- or three-year Licentiaat track. The latter was replaced by the Master of Science (MSc) academic degree. This system was not exclusive to scientific degrees and was also used for other programs like law and literature.

== Canada ==
In Canada, Master of Science (MSc) degrees may be entirely course-based, entirely research-based or (more typically) a mixture. Master's programs typically take one to three years to complete and the completion of a scientific thesis is often required. Admission to a master's program is contingent upon holding a four-year university bachelor's degree. Some universities require a master's degree in order to progress to a doctoral program (PhD).

=== Quebec ===
In the province of Quebec, the Master of Science follows the same principles as in the rest of Canada. There is one exception, however, regarding admission to a master's program. Since Québécois students complete two to three years of college before entering university, they have the opportunity to complete a bachelor's degree in three years instead of four. Some undergraduate degrees such as the Bachelor of Education and the Bachelor of Engineering requires four years of study. Following the obtention of their bachelor's degree, students can be admitted into a graduate program to eventually obtain a master's degree.

While some students complete their master's program, others use it as a bridge to doctoral research programs. After one year of study and research in the master's program, many students become eligible to apply to a Doctor of Philosophy (PhD) program directly, without obtaining the Master of Science degree in the first place.

== Chile ==
Commonly, Chilean universities have used "Magíster" for a master's degree, but other than that it is similar to the rest of South America.

== Cyprus ==
Like all EU member states, the Republic of Cyprus follow the Bologna Process. Universities in Cyprus have used either "Magíster Scientiae or Artium" or Master of Arts/Science for a master's degree with 90 to 120 ECTS and duration of studies between 1, 2 and 5 years.

== Czech Republic and Slovakia ==
Like all EU member states, Czech Republic and Slovakia follow the Bologna Process. Czech Republic and Slovakia both award two different types of master's degrees; both award a title of Mgr. or Ing. to be used before the name.

Prior to reforms for compliance with the Bologna process, a master's degree could only be obtained after 5 years of uninterrupted study. Under the new system, it takes only 2 years but requires a previously completed 3-year bachelor's program (a Bc. title). Writing a thesis (in both master's and bachelor's programs) and passing final exams are necessary to obtain the degree. It is mostly the case that the final exams cover the main study areas of the whole study program, i.e. a student is required to prove their knowledge in the subjects they attended during the 2 resp. 3 years of their study. Exams also include the defence of a thesis before an academic board.

Ing. (Engineer) degrees are usually awarded for master's degrees achieved in the Natural Sciences or Mathematics-heavy study programmes, whereas an Mgr. (Magister) is generally awarded for Master's studies in social sciences, humanities and the arts.

== Egypt ==
The Master of Science (MSc) is an academic degree for post-graduate candidates or researchers, it usually takes from 4 to 7 years after passing the Bachelor of Science (BSc) degree. Master programs are awarded in many sciences in the Egyptian Universities. A completion of the degree requires finishing a pre-master studies followed by a scientific thesis or research. All MSc degree holders are allowable to take a step forward in the academic track to get the PhD degree.

== Finland ==
Like all EU member states, Finland follows the Bologna Process. The Master of Science (MSc) academic degree usually follows the Bachelor of Science (BSc) studies which typically last three years. For the completion of both the bachelor and the master studies the student must accumulate a total of 300 ECTS credits, thus most Masters programs are two-year programs with 120 credits. The completion of a scientific thesis is required.

== Germany ==
Like all EU member states, Germany follows the Bologna Process. The Master of Science (MSc) academic degree replaces the once common Diplom or Magister programs that typically lasted four to five years. It is awarded in science-related studies with a high percentage of mathematics. For the completion the student must accumulate 300 ECTS Credits, thus most Masters programs are two-year programs with 120 credits. The completion of a scientific thesis is required.

== Guyana ==
In Guyana, all universities, including University of Guyana, Texila American University, American International School of Medicine have Master of Science courses as postgraduate degrees. Students who have completed undergraduate Bachelor of Science degree are eligible to study in this discipline.

== India ==
In India, universities offer MSc programs usually in sciences discipline. Generally, post-graduate scientific courses lead to MSc degree while post-graduate engineering courses lead to ME or MTech degree. For example, a master's in automotive engineering would normally be an ME or MTech, while a master's in physics would be an MSc. A few top universities also offer combined undergraduate-postgraduate programs leading to a master's degree which is known as integrated masters.

A Master of Science in Engineering (MSEngg) degree is also offered in India. It is usually structured as an engineering research degree, lesser than PhD and considered to be parallel to MPhil degree in humanities and science. Some institutes such as IITs offer an MS degree for postgraduate engineering courses. This degree is considered a research-oriented degree whereas MTech or ME degree is usually not a research degree in India. MSc degree is also awarded by various IISERs which are one of the top institutes in India.

== Iran ==
In Iran, similar to Canada, Master of Science (MSc) or in Iranian form Kārshenāsi-e arshad degrees may be entirely course-based, entirely research-based, or most commonly a mixture. Master's programs typically take two to three years to complete and the completion of a scientific thesis is often required.

== Ireland ==
Like all EU member states, Ireland follows the Bologna Process. In Ireland, Master of Science (MSc) may be course-based with a research component or entirely research based. The program is most commonly a one-year program and a thesis is required for both course-based and research based degrees.

== Israel ==
In Israel, Master of Science (MSc) may be entirely course-based or include research. The program is most commonly a two-year program and a thesis is required only for research based degrees.

== Italy ==
Like all EU member states, Italy follows the Bologna Process. The degree Master of Science is awarded in the Italian form, Laurea Magistrale. Before the current organization of academic studies there was the Laurea. According to the subject the laurea could require four, five or six years of study. The laurea was subsequently split into a "laurea triennale" (three years) and a "laurea magistrale" (two more years).

== Nepal ==
In Nepal, universities offer the Master of Science degree usually in science and engineering areas. Tribhuvan University offers MSc degree for all the science and engineering courses. Pokhara University and Purbanchal University offer ME for engineering and MSc for science. Kathmandu University offers MS by Research and ME degrees for science and engineering. Students can do postgraduate degree in any fields of science like chemistry, biology, physics etc.

== Netherlands ==
Like all EU member states, the Netherlands follows the Bologna Process. In the past graduates of applied universities (HBO) were excluded from using titles such as MSc, as HBO institutions are formally not universities but polytechnic institutions of higher education. However, since 2014 academic titles are granted to any university graduate.

However, older academic titles used in the Netherlands are:

- ingenieur (abbreviated as ir.) (for graduates who followed a technical or agricultural program)
- meester (abbreviated as mr.) (for graduates who followed an LLM law program)
- doctorandus (abbreviated as drs.) (in all other cases).

The bearers of these titles can use either the older title, of MSc, LL.M or MA but not both for the same field of study.

== New Zealand ==
New Zealand universities commonly have coursework or research-based Master of Science courses for graduate students. They typically run for 2 years full-time, with varying amounts of research involved.

== Norway ==
Norway follows the Bologna Process. For engineering, the Master of Science academic degree has been recently introduced and has replaced the previous award forms "Sivilingeniør" (engineer, a.k.a. engineering master) and "Hovedfag" (academic master). Both were awarded after 5 years of university-level studies and required the completion of a scientific thesis.

"Siv.ing", is a protected title traditionally awarded to engineering students who completed a five-year education at The Norwegian University of Science and Technology (Norwegian: Norges teknisk-naturvitenskapelige universitet, NTNU) or other university programs deemed to be equivalent in academic merit. Historically there was no bachelor's degree involved and today's program is a five years master's degree education. The "Siv.ing" title is in the process of being phased out, replaced by (for now, complemented by) the "M.Sc." title. By and large, "Siv.ing" is a title tightly being held on to for the sake of tradition. In academia, the new program offers separate three-year bachelor and two-year master programs. It is awarded in the natural sciences, mathematics and computer science fields. The completion of a scientific thesis is required. All master's degrees are designed to certify a level of education and qualify for a doctorate program.

Master of Science in Business is the English title for those taking a higher business degree, "Siviløkonom" in Norwegian. In addition, there is, for example, the 'Master of Business Administration' (MBA), a practically oriented master's degree in business, but with less mathematics and econometrics, due to its less specific entry requirements and smaller focus on research.

== Pakistan ==
Pakistan inherited its conventions pertaining to higher education from United Kingdom after independence in 1947. Master of Science degree is typically abbreviated as MSc (as in the United Kingdom) and which is awarded after 16 years of education (equivalent with a bachelor's degree in the US and many other countries). Recently, in pursuance to some of the reforms by the Higher Education Commission of Pakistan (the regulatory body of higher education in Pakistan), the traditional 2-year Bachelor of Science (BSc) degree has been replaced by the 4-year Bachelor of Science degree, which is abbreviated as BS to enable the Pakistani degrees with the rest of the world. Subsequently, students who pass a 4-year BS degree that is awarded after 16 years of education are then eligible to apply for MS degree, which is considered at par with Master of Philosophy (M.Phil.) degree.

== Poland ==
Like all EU member states, Poland follows the Bologna Process. The Polish equivalent of Master of Science is "magister" (abbreviated "mgr", written pre-nominally much like "Dr"). Starting in 2001, the MSc programs typically lasting 5 years began to be replaced as below:

- 3-year associates programs, (licentiate degree termed "licencjat" in Polish. No abbreviated pre-nominal or title.)
- 3.5-year engineer programs (termed "inżynier", utilizing the pre-nominal abbreviation "inż.")
- 2-year master programs open to both "licencjat" and "inż." graduates.
- 1.5-year master programs open only to "inż." graduates.

The degree is awarded predominantly in the natural sciences, mathematics, computer science, economics, as well as in the arts and other disciplines. Those who graduate from an engineering program prior to being awarded a master's degree are allowed to use the "mgr inż." pre-nominal ("master engineer"). This is most common in engineering and agricultural fields of study. Defense of a research thesis is required. All master's degrees in Poland qualify for a doctorate program.

== Russia ==
The title of "master" was introduced by Alexander I at 24 January 1803. The Master had an intermediate position between the candidate and doctor according to the decree "On colleges' structure". The master's degree was abolished from 1917 to 1934.

== South America ==
In Argentina, Brazil, Colombia, Ecuador, Mexico, Panama, Peru, Uruguay and Venezuela, the Master of Science or Magister is a postgraduate degree lasting two to four years. The admission to a master's program (Spanish: Licenciatura; Portuguese: Mestrado) requires the full completion of a four to five year long undergraduate degree, bachelor's degree, engineer's degree or a licentiate of the same length. Defense of a research thesis is required. All master's degrees qualify for a doctorate program. Depending on the country, one ECTS credit point can equal on average between 22 and 30 actual study hours. In most of these cases, the number of required attendance hours to the university classes will be at least half of that (one ECTS will mean around 11 to 15 mandatory hours of on-site classes).

== Southeastern Europe ==
In Slavic countries in the European southeast (particularly former Yugoslavian republics), the education system was largely based on the German university system (largely due to the presence and influence of the Austria-Hungary Empire in the region). Prior to the implementation of the Bologna Process, academic university studies comprised a 4–5 year-long graduate diplom program, which could have been followed by a 2–4 year long magistar program and then later with 2–5 year long doctor of science program.

After the Bologna Process implementation, again based on the German implementation, Diplom titles and programs were replaced by entirely professional bachelor's and master's programs. The studies are structured such that a master program lasts long enough for the student to accumulate a total of 300 ECTS credits, so its duration would depend on a number of credits acquired during the bachelor studies. Pre-Bologna magistar programs were abandoned – after earning an MSc degree and satisfying other academic requirements a student could proceed to earn a doctor of science degree directly, or skip MSc if the diplom program lasted more than 3 years as it was possible to do so for some time.

== Spain ==
Like all EU member states, Spain follows the Bologna Process. The Master of Science (MSc) degree is a program officially recognized by the Spanish Ministry of Education. It usually involves 1 or 2 years of full-time study. It is targeted at pre-experience candidates who have recently finished their undergraduate studies. An MSc degree can be awarded in every field of study. An MSc degree is required in order to progress to a PhD. MSci, MPhil and DEA are equivalent in Spain.

== Sweden ==
Like all EU member states, Sweden follows the Bologna Process. The Master of Science academic degree has, like in Germany, recently been introduced in Sweden. Students studying Master of Science in Engineering programs are rewarded both the English Master of Science Degree, but also the Swedish equivalent "Teknologisk masterexamen". Whilst "Civilingenjör" is an at least five year long education.

== Syria ==
The Master of Science is a degree that can be studied only in public universities. The program is usually 2 years, but it can be extended to 3 or 4 years. The student is required to pass a specific bachelor's degree to attend a specific Master of Science degree program. The master of science is mostly a research degree, except for some types of programs held with cooperation of foreign universities. The student typically attends courses in the first year of the program and should then prepare a research thesis.

== United Kingdom ==
The Master of Science (MSc) is typically a taught postgraduate degree, involving lectures, examinations and a project dissertation (normally taking up a third of the program). Master's programs usually involve a minimum of 1 year of full-time study (180 UK credits, of which 150 must be at master's level) and sometimes up to 2 years of full-time study (or the equivalent period part-time). Taught master's degrees are normally classified into Pass, Merit and Distinction (although some universities do not give Merit). Some universities also offer MSc by research programs, where a longer project or set of projects is undertaken full-time; master's degrees by research are normally pass/fail, although some universities may offer a distinction.

The more recent Master in Science (MSci) degree (Master of Natural Sciences at the University of Cambridge), is an undergraduate (UG) level integrated master's degree offered by UK institutions since the 1990s. It is offered as a first degree with the first three (four in Scotland) years similar to a BSc course and a final year (120 UK credits) at master's level, including a dissertation. The final MSci qualification is thus at the same level as a traditional MSc.

== United States ==
The Master of Science (Magister Scientiæ) degree is normally a full-time two-year degree often abbreviated MS. It is the primary type in most subjects and may be entirely course-based, entirely research-based or (more typically) a combination of the two. The combination often involves writing and defending a thesis or completing a research project which represents the culmination of the material learned.

Admission to a master's program is normally contingent upon holding a bachelor's degree. Progressing to a doctoral program may require a master's degree. In some fields or graduate programs, work on a doctorate can begin immediately after the bachelor's degree. Some programs provide for a joint bachelor's and master's degree after about five years. Some universities use the Latin degree names and due to the flexibility of word order in Latin, Artium Magister (AM) or Scientiæ Magister (SM or ScM) may be used in some institutions.

== See also ==
- Master of Science in Accounting
- Master of Science in Administration
- Master of Science in Computer Science
- Master of Science in Corporate Communication
- Master of Science in Economics
- Master of Science in Engineering
- Master of Science in Finance
- Master of Science in Foreign Service
- Master of Science in Information Systems
- Master of Science in Information Technology
- Master of Science in Management
- Master of Science in Nursing
- Master of Science in Occupational Therapy
- Master of Science in Physician Assistant Studies
- Master of Science in Project Management
- Master of Science in Systems Management
