= Bachelor of Information Technology =

Bachelor's degree program

A Bachelor of Information Technology (abbreviations BIT or BInfTech or BTech IT) is an undergraduate academic degree that generally requires three to five years of study. While the degree has a major focus on computers and technology, it differs from a Bachelor of Computer Science in that students are also expected to study management and information science, and there are reduced requirements for mathematics.

== International variations ==
=== Australia ===
In BIT is a three-year or four-year undergraduate degree.

At the University of Technology, Sydney (UTS), a BIT degree is offered as either a three-year program with a choice of professional majors or as a co-operative scholarship degree formally called BIT (co-op) with two six-month paid internships.

At Swinburne University of Technology, a BIT is a three-year co-op scholarship degree incorporating two six-month job placements.

At RMIT University a BIT is offered as a three-year program, giving the student the choice of different majors. These majors are Application Programming, Business Applications, Multimedia Design, Network Programming, System Administration and Web Systems.

Other universities have structured their BIT programs to emphasise emerging specialisations or work-integrated learning. For example, some institutions offer fully online or hybrid delivery formats to cater to working professionals or remote learners, while others include embedded certifications from leading tech platforms. In Australia, some programs integrate industry-recognised certifications and offers pathways into cloud computing, cybersecurity and artificial intelligence specialisations.

The state of the BIT program in Australia is unstable, as many universities and colleges offer it as a technical program while others as a business, e-commerce related program. The Australian Computer Society recognizes all BIT degrees, however Engineers Australia only recognises BIT degrees that are technical.

=== Canada ===
In Canada, Carleton University and Algonquin College have jointly created four programs under the Bachelor of Information Technology degree: Information Resource Management, Interactive Multimedia and Design, Network Technology, and Optical Systems and Sensors. University of Ontario Institute of Technology also offers streams in Networking & Information Technology Security, and Game Development and Entrepreneurship.

=== Puerto Rico ===
In Puerto Rico several universities offer Bachelor of Information Technology degrees with specializations in Networking, Security, and/or Programming; typically awarded after four years of full-time study and the completion of a supervised project or internship. Universities in Puerto Rico offering this specialized education via in-person and online modalities include Columbia Central University, EDP University of Puerto Rico, and National University College.

=== South Africa ===
In South Africa the University of Pretoria offers the Baccalaureus in Information Technology (BIT) degree as a four-year undergraduate programme. The University of Pretoria is also the first university in South Africa to offer this degree. Upon successful completion of a BIT degree a student can continue with either a part-time or full-time MIT programme at the University of Pretoria to round off his or her professional training or enter the workforce. The BIT course includes, but is not limited to, the following subjects: Business Management, Economics, Statistics, Mathematics, English, Programming and Advanced Programming, Systems Development, Philosophy, Financial Accounting, Data Structures and Algorithms, Operating Systems, Databases, Networks, Artificial Intelligence, Information Organization and Retrieval, Computer Architecture, Software Engineering, Multimedia. As an alternative to BIT, the University of Pretoria's Computer Science Department offers two three-year degrees, BSc CS and BSc IT.

=== United Arab Emirates ===
In UAE, Skyline University College offers 4 years Bachelor of Science in Information Technology enterprise computing.

== See also ==
- Bachelor of Computing
- Bachelor of Business Information Systems
- Bachelor of Information technology management
- Bachelor of Software Engineering
- Bachelor of Computer Information Systems
- Bachelor of Computer Engineering
- Bachelor of Science in Information Technology
- Doctor of Information Technology
- Master of Science in Information Technology
