= Bachelor of Computer Science =

Bachelor's degree program studying theoretical or practical aspects of computing

The Bachelor of Computer Science (abbreviated BCompSc or BCS) is a bachelor's degree for completion of an undergraduate program in computer science. In general, computer science degree programs emphasize the mathematical and theoretical foundations of computing.

== Typical requirements ==
Because computer science is a wide field, courses required to earn a bachelor of computer science degree vary. A typical list of course requirements includes topics such as:

- Computer programming
- Programming paradigms
- Algorithms
- Data structures
- Logic & Computation
- Computer architecture

Some schools may place more emphasis on mathematics and require additional courses such as:

- Linear algebra
- Calculus
- Probability theory and statistics
- Combinatorics and discrete mathematics
- Differential calculus and mathematics

Beyond the basic set of computer science courses, students can typically choose additional courses from a variety of different fields, such as:

- Theory of computation
- Operating systems
- Numerical computation
- Compilers, compiler design
- Real-time computing
- Distributed systems
- Computer networking
- Data communication
- Computer graphics
- Artificial intelligence
- Human-computer interaction
- Information theory
- Software testing
- Information assurance
- Quality assurance

Some schools allow students to specialize in a certain area of computer science.

== Related degrees ==
- Bachelor of Software Engineering
- Bachelor of Science in Information Technology
- Bachelor of Computing
- Bachelor of Information Technology
- Bachelor of Computer Information Systems

== See also ==
- Computer science
- Computer science and engineering
- Bachelor of Business Information Systems
