= Suresh Immanuel =

Business and Engineering Dean

Academic background
- Education: Ph.D., Auburn University; MSL, University of Evansville; MEng, Anna University; BEng, Anna University
- Thesis: Development of flexible pavement rut prediction models from the NCAT Test Track structural study sections data (2007)
- Doctoral advisor: David H. Timm

Academic work
- Discipline: Engineering
- Sub-discipline: Civil engineering
- Institutions: University of Evansville
- Website: www.evansville.edu/directory/bio-suresh-immanuel.cfm

Suresh Immanuel is a professor of civil engineering and the Dean of the College of Business and Engineering at the University of Evansville.

== Career ==
Immanuel started his academic career as a tenure track assistant professor of civil engineering at Bradley University, before moving to the University of Evansville in 2009. He was the chair of the Department of Mechanical and Civil Engineering from 2019 to 2021, before becoming the associate dean of the School of Engineering and Computer Science in 2021. He also took up the role of associate provost for Academic Partnerships in 2024.

In December 2024, he was named the dean of business and engineering school. His appointment as the dean was effective since June 1, 2025.

== Education ==
Immanuel completed his Bachelor of Engineering in Civil Engineering from Anna University, and his Masters in Engineering from the same institution. In 2007, he earned a Ph.D. in Civil Engineering from Auburn University.
