= Master of Business =

Postgraduate university degree

A Master of Business (MBus), Master of Business Science (MBSc), or Master of Business Studies (MBS) is a postgraduate academic degree. It refers to a qualification in the degree of master that can be obtained by students of recognized universities who complete the relevant approved requirements for graduation.

The requirements may involve the publishing of a thesis, participating in coursework, pass prescribed examinations, or a combination of these.

Generally, an MBus is similar to a Masters in Business Administration (MBA). These two degrees do not have significant difference. An MBus tends to be more theoretical in nature, may be dissertation-based, and does not generally require work experience to be accepted into the program. An MBA, meanwhile, tends to be more practical, and include coursework, as well as a certain number of years of work experience required to enter the program.

A Master of Business Science degree is distinct from a Master of Commerce, however both may be taught by a single Faculty of Commerce or Faculty of Business at some universities.

== Typical Framework ==
The course differs amongst institutions, and can be in either researched or taught format, as well as either full-time or part-time. In general, it will encompass some or all of the following modules. Students who wish to focus in a particular area of study may (if the university allows) choose a sequence of courses from within the specializations:

- Accounting & Auditing
- Corporate Social Responsibility
- Electronic Business
- Finance
- Human Resource Management
- International Business
- Information Systems
- Supply Chain Management
- Management & Organizational Studies
- Management Consultancy
- Marketing
- Project Management
- Entrepreneurship and Innovation Management

The orientation of the program may depend on the chosen specialization. Students may eventually choose to specialize in any of the above areas or in areas of particular relevance to them and their future careers.

A typical course outline involves either structured coursework, independent research, or a combination of the two, with a strong emphasis on student initiative.

A Master of Business Science generally takes between 12 and 24 months to complete.

== See also ==
- Bachelor of Business
- Bachelor of Commerce
- Master of Commerce
- Master of Business Administration
- Master of Management
- Master of Science in Management
- Doctor of Commerce
- Business school
- Business schools listed by country
