= Bachelor of Computing =

Bachelor's Degree Program

A Bachelor of Computing (B.Comp.) is an undergraduate degree in computing.

This degree is offered in a small number of universities, and varies slightly from a Bachelor of Science (B.Sc.) in Computer Science or Information Technology, a Bachelor of Science in Information Technology (B.Sc IT.) or a Bachelor of Computer Science (B.CS.).

== Academics ==
Most universities confer a Bachelor of Computing degree to a student after four years of full-time study (generally 120 credit hours) have been completed.

Potential specialisations within a B.Comp. vary greatly, and may include: Cognitive Science, Computer Science, Information Technology, Management Information Systems, Medical Informatics, Medical Imaging, Multimedia, or Software Engineering.

== Job prospects ==
A Bachelor of Computing integrated with science can lead to various professional careers, ranging from data analysis and cyber security analysis to game designing and developing. Other fields in which this degree could be useful include business analysis, IT training, nanotechnology and network engineering.

== See also ==
- Bachelor of Computer Information Systems
- Bachelor of Computer Science
- Bachelor of Information Technology
- Bachelor of Science in Information Technology
