= Joyce Nakatumba Nabende =

Lecturer at the department of Computer Science at Makerere University

Joyce Nakatumba Nabende is a lecturer at the department of Computer Science at Makerere University. She is the lead at Makerere Center for Artificial Intelligence at Makerere University and serves as the United Nations Independent International Scientific Panel on AI. She is a member of the Educational Advisory Committee of the Association for Computing Machinery, as well as the board member for Data Science Africa. Dr Joyce is also serving at different capacities such as, Founding Member of the Open for Good Alliance Inclusive AI Commons.

== Career ==
Dr. Joyce pursued a bachelor's degree in Computer Science from Mbarara University of Science and Technology, and joined a Masters of Science in computer science from Makerere University in Kampala, and later joined a PhD program and now holds a PhD in Computer Science from Eindhoven University of Technology in the Netherlands. She serves as a board member at Responsible Artificial Intelligence Africa Network. Dr. Joyce serves as a research scientist within the ARUA, a guild cluster of Research Excellence focused on Global and African challenges in AI and Data Science. She has authored publications and journals at Research Gate, an online publishing platform for global researchers.

== See also ==
- Aminah Zawedde
- Barbara Birungi
- Dorothy Okello
- Rowena Turinawe
