= Public relations officer =

Head of communications in an organization

A public relations officer (PRO) or chief communications officer (CCO) or corporate communications officer is a C-suite level officer responsible for communications, public relations, and/or public affairs in an organization. Typically, the CCO of a corporation reports to the chief executive officer (CEO). The CCO may hold an academic degree in communications. A PRO has a positive public opinion of an organization and increased brand knowledge as their first concern. They access and monitor their client's online presence to prepare the right message to convey. They can also coach clients on the importance of self-image and how to communicate with the media. A PRO aims to positively handle and communicate information internally and externally.

== Role ==
The PRO of a company is the corporate officer primarily responsible for managing the communications risks and opportunities of a business, both internally and externally. This executive is typically responsible for communications to a wide range of stakeholders, including employees, shareholders, media, bloggers, influential members of the business community, the press, the community and the public. Typically, a PRO may partner with others in an organization to communicate with investors, analysts, customers and company board members. Most organizations rely on the PRO to advise and participate in decisions that may impact the ongoing reputation of the firm.

The PRO's role is further defined by the Arthur Page Society. This study indicates the importance of the role especially as a key advisor to the CEO. In addition to the CCO title, comparable titles include vice president of corporate communications, vice president of public affairs or public information officer in governmental organizations.

== Qualifications ==
Qualifications for a CCO typically include communications experience with multiple stakeholder groups. Early experience may include journalism, work in a public relations agency or an MBA-type background in strategy or business development. In many cases, a CCO will need to assume responsibility for plans and outcomes that are the result of actions by persons throughout the organization. Korn/Ferry's Corporate Affairs Center of Expertise conducted a study of CCOs at 67 Fortune 200 companies in order to develop a current profile of the individuals who run the communications function at major global organizations. The survey reviewed how these executives are compensated, the size and scope of their responsibility and where they reside organizationally.

== Related articles ==
- Communications manager
- Master of Corporate Communication
- Organizational communication
