= MSDF =

MSDF may mean:

- Japan Maritime Self-Defense Force, the Japanese Navy
- State Defense Forces:
  - Massachusetts State Defense Force
  - Missouri State Defense Force
- Milwaukee Secure Detention Facility, a prison
- Master of Science in Digital Forensics, an academic degree
- Multi-channel signed distance field, a field created by a signed distance function

Danish company "Møbler Samling Drømmen Flyder", site
