= Master of Science in Supply Chain Management =

A Master of Science in Supply Chain Management (abbreviated SCM or MSSCM) is a type of postgraduate academic master's degree awarded by universities in many countries. This degree is typically studied for in Supply Chain Management and Logistics.

== Curriculum structure ==
The Master of Science in Supply Chain Management is a one to three years Master Degree, depending on the program, some may even start with two-year preparation classes and covers various areas of Supply chain management.

Topics of study may include:

- Customer-driven supply chain (link broken)
- Customer relationship management
- Demand chain management
- Electronic data interchange
- Enterprise planning systems
- Enterprise resource planning
- Integrated business planning
- Inventory control system
- Just-in-Time
- Liquid logistics
- Logistics management
- Material Requirements Planning
- Military supply chain management
- Operations management
- Order fulfillment
- Procurement
- Quality assurance
- Reverse logistics
- Supply chain network
- Supply chain security
- Total Quality Management
- Vendor-managed inventory

== Institutions with MS Supply Chain Management Degree Programs ==
According to the 2017 Eduniversal's Best Masters Ranking, the follow institutions ranked best with their SCM-related Master's programs:

1. Massachusetts Institute of Technology - In collaboration with Malaysia Institute for Supply Chain Innovation for Malaysia-based program
2. Purdue University
3. John Molson School of Business
4. Universidade Nova de Lisboa
5. Pontifical Catholic University of Peru
6. KEDGE Business School
7. Copenhagen Business School
8. Universidad Complutense de Madrid
9. Bocconi University
10. MIP Politecnico di Milano
11. Université Paris-Dauphine
12. Schulich School of Business

== See also ==
- List of master's degrees
- CSCMP Supply Chain Process Standards
