= Kristy Scott =

American social media personality (born 1995)

Kristy Sarah Small
- Born: Kristy Sarah Small
- Education: University of Houston (BSc)
- Occupation: Social media personality
- Years active: 6
- Known for: The Scotts
- Height: 162.6 cm (5 ft 4 in)
- Spouse: Desmond Scott (m. 2014; div. 2025)
- Children: 2

TikTok information
- Page: kristy.sarah
- Followers: 16.1 million

YouTube information
- Channel: Kristy Sarah
- Years active: 2020-present
- Genres: Vlog, Lifestyle
- Subscribers: 4.91 million
- Views: 2.50 billion
- Last updated: April 2, 2025

Kristy Sarah Small also known as Kristy Sarah, is an American social media personality. She gained a large following across platforms through videos centered on family-friendly content, including pranks, lifestyle, and home design. In 2023, Small was recognized in the Forbes 30 Under 30 list for social media influencers.

== Background and education ==
Based in Texas, Kristy graduated from the University of Houston with a Bachelor of Computer Information Systems degree at the age of 20.

== Career ==
Following her graduation from university, Kristy worked as an IT engineer. She left working in the ICT industry to pursue social media content creation full-time. She began her content-creating career by posting videos alongside her former husband and their kids. Her content focuses on family-oriented fun and reactions, and home design, aesthetics and renovation. She became very popular with her videos on social media. One video shows her tricking her former husband with a cake that looks like a chicken, and another video shows her making a playhouse for her kids.

Kristy and her former husband were guests at the 64th Annual Grammy Awards in April 2022. By 2023, she had amassed approximately 11 million followers across TikTok, Instagram, and YouTube, and secured brand partnerships with companies including Estée Lauder, Hilton, and Google. That year, she was included in the Forbes 30 under 30 social media category.

In 2023, Kristy released her personalized planner in a collaborative effort with notebook maker North + Third. The planner, which was a 6-month, 174-page scheduling format, included pages for setting goals, bucket lists, managing one's projects, and budgeting, alongside the conventional weekly and monthly pages of the calendar.

== Personal life ==
Kristy married Desmond Scott, her high school sweetheart, in 2014 after four years of dating. They have two sons together and own a production company centered on wedding videography. In 2024, the couple celebrated their 10th wedding anniversary with a lavish party that was featured in People magazine. Kristy filed for divorce on December 30, 2025, citing alleged infidelity that "completely wiped out any reasonable chance of reconciliation." In her divorce petition, she requested that the court restore her surname to her maiden name, Small.
