= Rowena Turinawe =

Ugandan information technology professional and corporate executive

- Born: Uganda
- Education: Makerere University; University of Manchester
- Occupations: Information technology professional and corporate executive
- Years active: 2008–present
- Title: CEO, RukaPay

Rowena Turinawe is a Ugandan information technology professional and corporate executive, who is the founding CEO of e-commerce company RukaPay. She previously worked as the head of Innovation and Digital Services, at Centenary Technology Services Limited (Cente-Tech), the technology subsidiary company of the Centenary Group. Before that, she served as business transformation manager at National Information Technology Authority Uganda (NITA-Uganda), a government parastatal organization.

== Background and education ==
Turinawe is Ugandan by birth. After attending local primary and secondary schools, she was admitted to Makerere University, Uganda's largest and oldest public university. She graduated from there with a first class Bachelor of Information Technology degree. Later, she was awarded a Master of Information Systems and Change Management, by the University of Manchester, in the United Kingdom. In addition, she has attended and graduated from multiple professional courses, including Senior Leadership Development Training at Strathmore Business School, Change Management Practitioner (PROSCI), Cisco Certified Network Associate (CCNA), COBIT 5, Information Technology Infrastructure Library (ITIL®), Project Management Professional (PMP®), and ITIL.

== Career ==
Turinawe's career began in 2012, as the Network Operations Centre Engineer at Roke Telkom. After stints in two private companies, she was hired by MTN Uganda where she served as front office service manager for MTN Group IT shared services. In this capacity she led the technical support team in Uganda, Rwanda, Swaziland, Zambia, and South Sudan. In these five countries, with 48,000 employees, the team that she led responded to service request fulfillments and resolved incident reports in a timely manner.

In 2016, she joined NITA Uganda, working as a portfolio manager for the first three years, and as a business transformation manager for the next three years. She was responsible for overseeing the development and rollout of IT systems under the supervision of over 100 chief information officers and 200 information systems in government.

She is regarded as an expert in strategic planning and implementation, enterprise architecture development, ICT strategy and research, IT service management, stakeholder management, technical support management, and service delivery.

== Other considerations ==
In November 2021, Turinawe, employed by NITA Uganda at the time, was recognized as being among the "35 Most Influential Women In Technology In Africa", by CIO Africa, an authoritative industry magazine.

In the same year, Turinawe was named by Joyce Ssebugwawo, the Ugandan State Minister of Information and Communications Technology, to be a member of the newly created National Business Processing Outsourcing (BPO) and Innovation Council. The body is tasked to work with government to create jobs for youth in ICT and reduce unemployment.

Turinawe was named "Top Young ICT Professional of the Year in Africa" by the ICT Association of Uganda (ICTAU) on behalf of TRICON in 2023. She was listed among "Africa’s top 40 women leaders in Fintech" by the HiPipo Foundation in 2024.

Turinawe wrote the book Digital Transformation: The North Star You Need, aimed at helping leaders in senior management positions to navigate common oversights and challenges in this digital era.
