= César Mauricio Velásquez Ossa =

Colombia Ambassador to the Holy See
- Incumbent
- Assumed office 18 October 2010
- President: Juan Manuel Santos Calderón
- Preceded by: Juan Gómez Martínez

Press Secretary of the President of Colombia
- In office 23 February 2007 – 7 August 2010
- President: Álvaro Uribe Vélez
- Preceded by: Ricardo Galán Osma
- Succeeded by: John Jairo Ocampo Niño

Personal details
- Born: Medellín, Antioquia, Colombia
- Education: University of the Savannah (BJ, 1990); Complutense University of Madrid (MIA, 1999)
- Profession: Journalist

César Mauricio Velásquez Ossa was the Ambassador of Colombia to the Holy See as of 2010. He had previously served as Press Secretary for President Álvaro Uribe Vélez from 2007 to 2010.

== Selected works ==
- Velásquez Ossa, César Mauricio (1995). Andrés Escobar: En Defensa de la Vida (in Spanish). Medellín: Bedout Editores. ISBN 978-958-03-0124-0. OCLC 39968933.
