= Partsch =

Partsch is a surname. Notable people with the surname include:

- Hoseah Partsch, New Zealand-Australian singer-songwriter
- Joseph Partsch (1851–1925), German geographer
- Paul Maria Partsch (1791–1856), Austrian mineralogist
- Walter Partsch (1923–2001), Austrian cinematographer
- Wolfgang Partsch (born 1945), Austrian academic and business leader

== See also ==
- Parcz
