= Marjorie Magner =

American business executive

- Born: c. 1950
- Education: Brooklyn College
- Occupation: Business executive

Marjorie Magner (born c. 1950) is an American business executive. She is the co-founder of Brysam Global Partners, a private equity firm, and the chairman of the Gannett Corporation.

== Education ==
Marjorie Magner was born around 1950. She graduated from Brooklyn College, with a Bachelor of Science degree in psychology in 1969. She later earned an MSIA from the Krannert School of Management at Purdue University.

== Career ==
Magner held various positions within Citigroup Inc., including senior executive vice president and head of consumer banking, from 2003 to 2005.

Magner is the co-founder of Brysam Global Partners, a private equity firm where she serves as a managing partner. Additionally, she is the non-executive chairman of both the Gannett Corporation and Accenture PLC.

Magner also serves on the board of directors of Ally Financial Inc.

Magner was named one of the Most Powerful Women in Business from 2001–2004 in the Fortune magazine list and was ranked #19 in the Forbes magazine list of World's Most Powerful Women.

== Philanthropy ==
Magner serves on the board of trustees of the Brooklyn College Foundation, a fundraising organization for her alma mater. She is also a board member of The Forward newspaper and helps raise funds for them.
