= Wolfgang Partsch =

Austrian academic and pioneer in supply chain management

- Born: August 29, 1945 (age 80); Vienna, Austria
- Education: University of Vienna
- Occupations: Academic, pioneer, business executive
- Known for: Pioneer in the domain of supply chain management

Wolfgang Partsch (born August 29, 1945) is an Austrian academic and business leader that is a pioneer in the domain of supply chain management (SCM). As an author of various standard works he gained wide international recognition.

== Education ==
Wolfgang Partsch was awarded PhD in physics in 1970 by the University of Vienna with a thesis on the exploration of natural resources.

== Career ==
In 1979, the German monthly business magazine “Manager Magazin” published an article where Partsch described a supply chain concept explaining that efficiency could be achieved considering the interdependency among all areas of a company. Subsequently, he joined Booz Allen & Hamilton and was part of the team that, led by Keith Oliver, developed the first official Supply Chain concept and coined the term. By that time, Partsch was the leading manager in a Supply Chain implementation project for Landis+Gyr in Switzerland. The results of this project were published in Germany's leading economic magazine “WirtschaftsWoche", being the first time that an implemented project case under the term “Supply Chain Management” appeared in print in a newspaper as has been recognized by the CSCMP.

In 1983 he founded the first company worldwide specialized in SCM. In the following years he has held various consulting roles for international companies like Volkswagen, Aventis, Nestle and Coca-Cola.

During the 80s and 90s he became a person of reference in the Supply Chain Management arena mainly in German speaking countries. From 1995 to 1999 he led the Supply Chain Consulting practice of Ernst & Young as Chairman of the Global Supply Chain Network.

Since 2000 he has been active as a senior executive and trusted advisor for the boards of global industrial and trading companies. His experience is also used by some Supply Chain Consulting firms including mSE Solutions.
