= Master of Science in Organizational Leadership =

The Master of Science in Organizational Leadership (MSOL) is a multidisciplinary master's degree in leadership studies.

It is an alternative to, not a substitute for, the traditional Master of Business Administration (MBA) degree. The MSOL degree is multidisciplinary and focuses more on people and organization issues, and relatively less on business topics such as finance, accounting and marketing. For example, the MSOL will offer courses in psychology and philosophy as well as courses in business and management. Also, The MSOL degree is intended for those who are already established in a career, while, in contrast, those who are preparing to enter the world of work or change careers often seek an MBA degree.

The MSOL degree is similar to the Master of Science in Leadership (MSL) degree and the Masters of Organizational Leadership (MAOL).

An example of required core courses for the MSOL degree from National University (California)

| School | Course Number | Course Name |
|---|---|---|
| National University (California) | MSOL-5000 | Leadership Development and Practice |
| National University (California) | MSOL-5102 | Ethics and Decision Making |
| National University (California) | MSOL-5103 | People, Processes, and Organizational Health |
| National University (California) | MSOL-5104 | Leadership: Change, Crises, and Communication |
| National University (California) | MSOL-5105 | Leadership and Organizational Strategy |
| National University (California) | MSOL-5106 | Understanding Data |
| National University (California) | MSOL-5110 | Capstone Professional Project |
