= Master of Science in Human Resource Development =

Type of graduate degree

A Master of Science in Human Resource Development (abbreviated HRD or MSHRD) is a type of postgraduate academic master's degree awarded by universities in many countries. This degree is typically studied for in Human Resource Development and Human Resource Management. The key concepts include strategic human resource management, creatively studying and solving organisational problems and creating strategic alignment between human resource and organisational goals.

== Curriculum Structure ==
The Master of Science in Human Resource Development is a one to three years Master Degree, depending on the program, some may even start with two-year preparation classes and covers various areas of human resource development.

Topics of study may include:

- business transformation
- Competence (human resources)
- Competency-based management
- Corporate Culture
- corporate social responsibilities
- Employment relations
- Employer branding
- Employee engagement
- human resource policies
- Human resource management system
- Human resource management in public administration
- Industrial relations
- Labor mobility
- Organizational behavior and human resources
- organizational culture
- performance appraisal
- Recruitment Process Outsourcing
- succession planning
- Strategic human resource planning
- training and development
- workplace diversity

== Institutions with MS HRD Degree Programs ==
Institutions in the United States that have a Masters of Science in Human Resource Development Degree Program include:

- Clemson University
- Drexel University
- New York University
- Villanova University
- Xavier University
- University of Houston
- Florida International University
- Louisiana State University
- The University of Texas at Tyler

== See also ==
- List of master's degrees
- List of human resource management associations
- Chief human resources officer
- Human resource consulting
- Human Resource Development Council
- Professional in Human Resources
- Society for Human Resource Management
