= Master of Science in Information Technology =

Master's degree, academic title

A Master of Science in Information Technology (abbreviated M.Sc.IT, MScIT or MSIT) is a master's degree in the field of information technology awarded by universities in many countries or a person holding such a degree. The MSIT degree is designed for those managing information technology, especially the information systems development process. The MSIT degree is functionally equivalent to a Master of Information Systems Management, which is one of several specialized master's degree programs recognized by the Association to Advance Collegiate Schools of Business (AACSB). One can become a software engineer and data scientist after completing an MSIT degree.

== Curriculum ==
A joint committee of Association for Information Systems (AIS) and Association for Computing Machinery (ACM) members develop a model curriculum for the Master of Science in Information Systems (MSIT). The most recent version of the MSIS Model Curriculum was published in 2016.

== Course and variants ==
The course of study is concentrated around the Information Systems discipline. The core courses are (typically) Systems analysis, Systems design, Data Communications, Database design, Project management and Security. The degree typically includes coursework in both computer science and business skills, but the core curriculum might depend on the school and result in other degrees and specializations, including:

- Master of Science (Information Technology) M.Sc.(I.T)
- Master of Computer Applications (MCA)
- Master in Information Science (MIS)
- Master of Science in Information and Communication Technologies (MS-ICT)
- Master of Science in Information Systems Management (MISM)
- Master of Science in Information Technology (MSIT or MS in IT)
- Master of Computer Science (MCS)
- Master of Science in Information Systems (MSIS)
- Master of Science in Management of Information Technology (M.S. in MIT)
- Master of Information Technology (M.I.T.)
- Master of IT (M. IT or MIT) in Denmark
- Candidatus/candidata informationis technologiæ (Cand. it.) in Denmark
- Master of Information Science and Technology (M.I.S.T.) from The University of Tokyo and Osaka University, Japan

== See also ==
- ABET - Accreditation Board for Engineering and Technology (United States)
- List of master's degrees
- Bachelor of Computer Information Systems
- Bachelor of Information technology management
- Bachelor of Science in Information Technology
- Master of Science in Information Systems
