= Master of International Business =

The Master of International Business (MIB or M.I.B.) is a master's degree designed to develop the capabilities and resources of managers in the global economy. It is for those seeking to establish or accelerate a career in international business.

The origins of this type of program go back to the creation in 1946 of the American Institute of Foreign Trade, known today as Thunderbird School of Global Management, in Glendale, Arizona. Thunderbird's program was referred to as a Master of International Management until 2000, when it adopted the MBA in Global Management denomination. The structure of the program combined international business, international political economy, and learning of languages and world cultures. Other similar programs are now offered by a range of business schools under a variety of denominations.

Emphasizing the practical application of specialized knowledge, the program equips management with skills tailored to the international business environment. It focuses on strategic planning for international operations and provides an in-depth understanding of the organizational capabilities required for international operations, including specialized functions such as international marketing, finance and human resource management. Master in international business degrees also include classes that address topics such as imports and exports and intercultural communication. The degree may be thought of as an MBA with a particular focus on multinational corporations.

Abbreviations for this qualification include MIntBus, MBus (IntBus), or MIB

== Admission ==
Admission normally requires an undergraduate degree in any discipline, the equivalent of two years full-time work in a role that has an international focus, a personal statement and a successful GMAT/GRE score.

== Course Structure ==
The course structure is modelled on that of the MBA program.

The course is normally offered as a 16 subject program that would take two years of full-time study or four years of part-time study to complete.

Students who meet certain prerequisites may be able to undertake the degree as a 12 subject program. In this case, there would be an expectation of completion within 18 months if studying full-time or three years if studying part-time.

== See also ==
- List of master's degrees
- Master of International Affairs
