= Master of Taxation =

University higer degree

Master of Taxation (MTax), also known as a Master of Business Taxation (MBT), or Master of Science in Taxation (MSTax) is a higher degree in taxation conferred by universities.

MTax programs prepare graduates for executive careers in the accounting profession with a focus on taxation, where effective decisions require a detailed understanding of tax consequences. The MTax or a similar equivalent is usually housed within a university’s business school or law school to specifically train students for evaluating finances in compliance with tax codes. Sample curriculum could include: income tax, corporate tax, tax planning, inheritance tax, international tax, tax law or tax policy. Extensive prerequisites are common to be admitted to the program, such as an accounting degree or having the CPA designation. For programs not requiring accounting degrees, common requirements include calculus and undergraduate classes in economics, economic statistics, accounting, and finance. Most programs require 12 to 18 months to complete, but a part-time or flexible schedule may allow a longer completion interval.

MTax graduates often obtain job titles such as: tax examiner, financial manager, auditor, tax advisor, or tax manager.

== By country ==
=== Europe ===
==== Spain ====
- Charles III University of Madrid, Master in Taxation (MTax)

==== United Kingdom ====
- University of Oxford, Saïd Business School, Master of Science in Taxation (MSc in Taxation)

=== North America ===
==== Canada ====
- University of Waterloo, School of Accounting and Finance, Master of Taxation (MTax)
- Université de Sherbrooke, École de gestion, Master of Taxation (M.Fisc. / MTax)

==== United States ====
- University of Washington, Foster School of Business, Master of Science in Taxation (MST)
- University of Southern California, Marshall School of Business, Master of Business Taxation (MBT)
- Arizona State University, W. P. Carey School of Business, Master of Taxation (MTax)
- Golden Gate University, Master of Science in Taxation (MST)
- University of Cincinnati, Master of Science in Taxation (MS in Taxation)
- University of Miami, Master of Science in Taxation (MST)
- University of Minnesota, Carlson School of Management, Master of Business Taxation (MBT)
- University of Mississippi, Master of Taxation (MTax)
- University of Texas at Arlington, Master of Science in Taxation (MS in Taxation)
- Villanova University, Master of Taxation (MT)
- Gonzaga University, Master of Science in Taxation (MS in Taxation)
- San Jose State University, Master of Science in Taxation (MS in Taxation)
- Fairleigh Dickinson University, Master of Science in Taxation (MS in Taxation)

=== Oceania ===
==== Australia ====
- University of New South Wales, UNSW Business School, Master of Taxation (MTax)
- University of Sydney, Sydney Law School, Master of Taxation (MTax)
- University of Western Australia, Master of Taxation Law

==== New Zealand ====
- University of Auckland Law School (MTaxS)

== See also ==
- List of master's degrees
- Master of Accountancy
