= Horizon University College =

Defunct private college in United Arab Emirates

- Type: Private
- Established: September 1990
- Location: United Arab Emirates; United Arab Emirates

Horizon University College (HUC) was a private higher education institution in Ajman, United Arab Emirates. Founded in 1990, it was originally known as Skyline University College (SUC) and operated in Sharjah for 35 years before relocating to Ajman in 2025 under its new name. As of July 2026, the institution is no longer operational following withdrawal of licence by the Ministry of Higher Education and Scientific Research. A task force was formed to assist affected students with transferring to other education institutions.
