= Master of Science in Development Administration =

Type of graduate degree

Master in Development Administration or Master of Science in Development Administration (MSDEA) is a post graduate academic degree in Community Development. It is intended to train professionals for careers in public and private development administrations. It aims to provide the scholars with the procedural and specialized skills and capability in translating national development plans and policies into precise programs and projects, planning, implementing, coordinating and managing the same for public equity. The course of education focused on the political as well as the economic scope of development.

The MDA provides professional training for careers with government, non-profit, and international development organizations. Core classes employ the case study method to build skills in program and project analysis. Cases include microfinance, primary health care, small enterprise development, public enterprise reform, agricultural extension, and others from across the developing world.

MDA classes focus on development theories, such as those oriented to government action, economic markets, and popular participation; skills, such as budgeting, human resource management, research and writing, and public speaking; methods, such as cost-benefit analysis, the logical framework, stakeholder analysis, monitoring and evaluation, and institutional analysis; and the history of the development administration field. This field is inherently interdisciplinary, involving concepts from economics, political science, and public administration. While the MDA program is designed primarily as a professional program, instruction is grounded in prominent theories from these disciplines and provides a secure foundation for doctoral studies in the social sciences.

Professionals who undergo this type of academic program may become development specialist, Urban & Regional Development Planners, development researchers, and Community Sustainability managers and community relations officers (especially in mining corporations where mining operations take place.)

The Program prepares individuals to be creative, innovative and entrepreneurial administrators of the various levels and agencies of government, non-government, and international organizations.

It is designed to ensure that students acquire the ability to:

   *Conduct development research and policy analysis
   *Analyze and understand situations and processes that hinder or facilitate the development process
   *Formulate policies appropriate to the achievement of the goals of development[1]

Competencies:

   *Quality Assurance in Public Service
   *Urban and Rural Development Planning
   *Policy Analysis
   *Development Research
   *Project Evaluation and Analysis
   *Program Design and Implementation
   *Community-based Resource Management
   *Knowledge Management
   *Conflict and Negotiation Management
   *Planned Change in Development
   *Qualitative and Quantitative Decision Making
   *Social Entrepreneurship
   *Cultural Modification
   *Social Marketing

There are three majors to choose from for career development in an NGO or Government sector.

- Development Administration.
- Development Research & Administration.
- Organizational Studies

Master’s of Development administration, in general, will equip development workers and government leaders to make use of plans, policies, programmes and projects to fully strategize and attain socio-economic development.

After completing this academic program, the next step is the Doctor of Philosophy in Development Studies as the final degree in this field.

== Institutions Offering Master's Degrees in Development Administration ==
- Don Mariano Marcos Memorial State University (DMMMSU)
- University of Southeastern Philippines
- Western Michigan University
- University College London

Gandhigram Rural Institute - Deemed University, India

== Related Academic Degrees ==
- Master of Public Administration
- MSc Development Administration & Planning
- Master of Social Sciences
- Master of Project Management (MSPM or MPM), a postgraduate project management degree
- Bachelor of Science in Community Development
- Bachelor of Science in Public Administration
- Master of Nonprofit Organizations (MNO or MNPO), the postgraduate degree for philanthropy and voluntary sector professionals
- Master of Economics (M.Econ./M.Ec.)
- Masters of International Development Administration

== See also ==
- MSc Development Administration & Planning
- Public Administration
- Community Development
- Social Sciences
- Development Specialist
- Development Research and Administration
