= Master of Commerce =

Postgraduate academic degree

A Master of Commerce (MCom or M Com) is a postgraduate degree designed to provide knowledge in commerce, accounting, mathematics, economics, and management-related subjects. Like the undergraduate Bachelor of Commerce, the degree is mainly offered in Commonwealth nations, as well as Spain and several Latin American states.

== Structure ==
The Master of Commerce typically requires one or two years of full-time study. The curriculum is generally concentrated on one subject area, see aside, and emphasizes underlying theory. Relatedly, programs usually include a thesis component, and may be exclusively research based.

Given this structure, the MCom differs from other business and management degrees:

- Its concentration on one area distinguishes it from generalist degrees, such as the MBA. Some universities offer the MCom in general management, although this is more similar to the Master of Management than to the MBA; see also Master of Business.
- As compared to specialised degrees – such as the Master of Science in Finance or Master of Accounting – the MCom places more emphasis on theory; see also Master of Science in Management.

Admission to the MCom usually requires completion of a Bachelor of Commerce, or similar compatible degree; often, an Honours degree will be required. Depending on the degree focus, a related undergraduate major and / or a fairly strong quantitative background may also be a prerequisite. Some MCom programs admit students from science or engineering backgrounds – these programs usually require that students complete a bridging course, or undertake an extended program.

== Post graduation ==
Based on specialisation, MCom graduates are typically employed in fields related to their degree foci, such as international commerce, financial services, marketing, project management, general management and business consulting.

Programs are sometimes structured such that graduates are eligible for membership of various professional bodies or institutes. In some cases, the institutional qualification program itself may, in fact, be offered as an MCom degree (e.g. the Australian Institute of Public Accountants formerly offered its IPA program as an MCom in Public Accounting prior to July 2017.)

The MCom includes a research component and thus provides access to a doctorate; progressing from the MCom, a student can pursue a Doctor of Commerce (DCom), Doctor of Business Administration (DBA), or a Doctor of Philosophy (Ph.D.) degree program.

== See also ==
- Bachelor of Commerce
- Doctor of Commerce
- Commercial management
- Master of Management
- Master of Science in Management
- Master of Business
- Business school
- Business education § Postgraduate education
- Business schools listed by country
- Commerce § Education
