= Master of International Affairs =

Professional graduate degree

A Master of International Affairs (MIA) is a professional master's degree in international affairs.

== Subject matter ==
Details can vary between degree-granting institutions, but such a degree typically includes these core courses:

- Forms of government
- Diplomacy
- Sociology
- Political philosophy
- Defense policy
- International law
- International relations
- International political economy
- International history
- International finance
- International economics

Additionally, certificates in functional concentrations (international business diplomacy, global gender policy, etc.) and regional concentrations (Asian studies, Arab studies, etc.) are offered to complement the core degree. Some programs also require proficiency in foreign languages, in addition to completing free electives outside the main program.

These programs are typically offered by members of the Association of Professional Schools of International Affairs (APSIA), an association of schools of international affairs. It has member schools and departments from across the United States, Canada, Europe, and Asia.

== See also ==
- Inside the Ivory Tower, a ranking of master's programs in international relations by Foreign Policy
- List of master's degrees
- Master of International Business
- Master of Public Policy
- International relations
