= Master of Sacred Music =

The Master of Sacred Music (MSM or SMM) degree is a two to five-year post-baccalaureate degree that combines academic and musical studies. The closure of graduate programs in organ performance across America has made the MSM increasingly the de facto degree for advanced studies in church music; MSM graduates who wish to continue their studies have the option of academic (Ph.D. or Th.D.) or applied (DMA) tracks. Most MSM programs are limited to choral conducting and organ performance, as these two applied fields are the primary occupations of church music directors. Piano Performance is usually taught as a subdiscipline or acquired separately.

Master of Sacred Music programs in the United States include:

- Boston University School of Theology, Boston, MA
- Catholic Institute of Sacred Music at St. Patrick's Seminary, Menlo Park, CA
- School of Sacred Music at Hebrew Union College-Jewish Institute of Religion, New York, NY
- Cantorial school of the Jewish Theological Seminary of America, New York, NY
- Perkins School of Theology at Southern Methodist University, Dallas, TX
- Westminster Choir College at Rider University
- University of Notre Dame, Notre Dame, IN
- University of St. Thomas, Houston, TX

Boston University's program is the oldest (BU is also host to the oldest higher education program in music in the United States) and the Catholic Institute of Sacred Music's is the youngest (admitting its first students in Summer 2026). An MSM program at Union Theological Seminary was dissolved when UTS' Institute of Sacred Music was dissolved and moved to Yale.

On November 14, 2012, Luther Seminary ended its MSM program; then-current students were permitted to finish out their studies, but no new applicants were accepted following the decision, which was made by President Richard Bliese against the recommendations of the seminary's Educational Leadership Committee (ELC).

== Related programs ==
Several institutions of higher education offer master's programs in Liturgical Music or Master of Music programs in Sacred Music. These are distinguished from MSM programs by their primary focus on the applied music components. An example of such programs can be found at the Catholic University of America's Institute of Sacred Music, which recently converted its masters and doctoral programs in liturgical music to MM and DMA programs in sacred music. Another example is University of Alabama's MM degree in Church Music.

- Claremont Graduate University offers a Master of Arts in Church Music, and it is the only institution offering the terminal Doctor of Church Music (D.C.M.).
- The Mary Pappert School of Music at Duquesne University in Pittsburgh, PA offers a Master of Music in Sacred Music degree.
- The Institute of Sacred Music at Yale University in New Haven, CT offers a Master of Music in Sacred Music degree.
