= Master of Science in Cyber Security =

A Master of Science in Cyber Security is a type of postgraduate academic master's degree awarded by universities in many countries. This degree is typically studied for in cyber security. What is offered by many institutions is actually called a Master in Strategic Cyber Operations and Information Management (SCOIM) which is commonly understood to be a Master in Cybersecurity. This degree is offered by at least some universities in their Professional Studies program (GWU for one) so that it can be accomplished while students are employed - in other words it allows for "distance learning" or online attendance. Requirements for the Professional Studies program include: 3.0 or better undergrad GPA, professional recommendations letters and an essay.

== Curriculum Structure ==
The Master of Science in Cyber Security is a one to three years Master Degree, depending on the program, some may even start with two-year preparation classes and covers various areas of computer science, Internet security, Computer security, and or Information Assurance. Programs are offered online, on-campus, or a hybrid style. Please note that some schools offer the option of a graduate certificate in Cyber Security (for those not looking to do a full program). Other schools may offer a broader professional master's degree in a field of computing or business with a specialization is cyber security, cyber defense or information assurance. The National Initiative for Cybersecurity Education (NICE) has developed a framework for cyber security education and workforce development. Likewise, the National Centers of Academic Excellence in Cyber Defense (CAE-CD) framework was designed in a collaboration between the National Security Agency and the Department of Homeland Security.

Topics of study may include:

- Advanced persistent threat
- Advertising network
- Analytics
- Bulletproof hosting
- Browser security
- Certificate authority
- Computer ethics
- Computer forensics
- Computer insecurity
- Computer security
- Computer security policy
- Cryptography
- Cybercrime
- Cyber-collection
- Cyber ShockWave
- Cyber spying
- Cyber security standards
- Cyberpsychology
- Cyberterrorism
- Cyberwarfare in Russia
- Dark web
- Denial-of-service attack
- Digital forensics
- Economics of security
- Electronic warfare
- Fully undetectable
- Hacker (computer security)
- Industrial espionage
- Information assurance
- Information security
- Information warfare
- Internet governance
- IT risk
- iWar
- Legal aspects of computing
- License
- Malware
- Open-source bounty
- Password cracking
- Penetration test
- Phishing
- Privilege escalation
- Proactive Cyber Defence
- Quantum cryptography
- Remote administration software
- Sandbox (computer security)
- Security management
- Signals intelligence
- Swatting
- User Error
- Vulnerability
- Watering Hole
- Zero-day attack

== See also ==
- List of master's degrees
- List of cyber attack threat trends
- CERT Coordination Center
- Committee on National Security Systems
- IT risk § Standards organizations and standards
- National Security Directive
- National Strategy to Secure Cyberspace
- National Cyber Security Division
- United States Department of Homeland Security
- US-CERT
