= Master of Criminal Justice =

The Master of Criminal Justice (abbreviated MCJ) is a postgraduate professional master's degree that is designed as a terminal degree for professionals in the field of criminal justice, criminology, or as preparation for doctoral programs.

Areas of concentration include probation and court services, administration, forensic anthropology, forensic psychology, justice administration, security management, corrections and correctional counseling, homeland security, crime and delinquency, crime analysis, prevention and control, human services, criminal justice planning and research, crime scene investigation, global issues, law, leadership and executive management, and public safety.

== General ==
In most countries, applicants are required to hold minimum a three-four year undergraduate degree and may have a minimum period of required professional experience in the criminal justice system, however the quantum varies between universities. Recipients of this degree typically study the field of criminology.
