= Master of Arts (Theology and Religion) =

Academic graduate degree

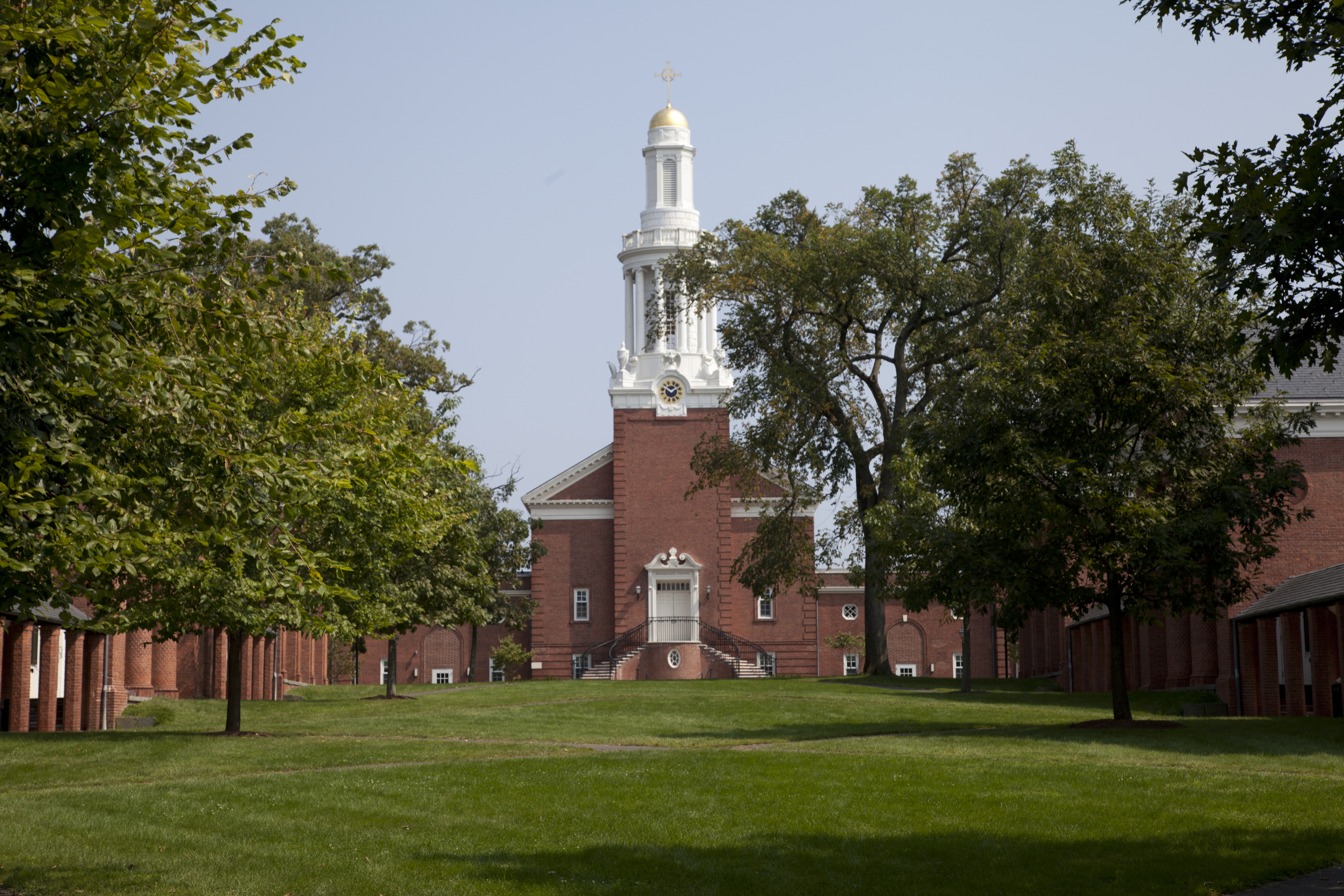
Yale Divinity School styles its program as the Master of Arts in Religion (MAR).

The Master of Arts (Theology and Religion) in a religious discipline is a graduate degree, offered in seminary or other graduate school, which gives students a basic understanding in theological disciplines. It is often pursued by individuals interested in academia, ministry, or further theological study. While the requirements can vary, the program typically involves taught coursework, research projects, and a thesis or capstone project.

Due to the variety of specialization, many alternative names are used, including:

- Master of Theological Studies (MTS)
- Master of Arts in Religion (MAR)
- Master of Religious Education (MRE)
- Master of Arts in Theological Studies (MATS)
- Master of Arts in [specialization], (e.g. Church Revitalization, Counseling, Ministry, Worship)

The degree may serve as preparation for entering a masters or doctoral program in religion (e.g. ThM, DMin, ThD, PhD), or a related subject, such as education, counseling, social sciences, or humanities. North American programs are accredited by the Association of Theological Schools, the Transnational Association of Christian Colleges and Schools, the Association for Biblical Higher Education, or regional accreditors.

The MA should not be confused with the Master of Theology (ThM) degree, which is usually an additional year-long program of advanced study after the MA or Master of Divinity (MDiv) degree focusing on one area of special interest.

== Curriculum ==
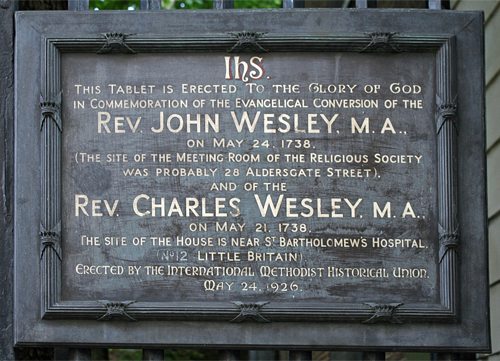
John and Charles Wesley each earned the MA at Christ Church, Oxford.

According to ATS standards, applicants must have an accredited bachelor's degree or its equivalent. The standards specify that the bulk of courses in the MA program be academic rather than professional. Programs usually require students to complete two years of full-time study or its equivalent.

Program curriculum is diverse and intended to give students a broad understanding of theological disciplines. Core subjects often include:

- Biblical Studies
- Church History
- Systematic Theology
- Ethics
- Comparative Religion
- Practical Theology

The MA may require the completion of a summative evaluation, which could be a thesis or other project. The program usually takes two years of full-time study to complete, although part-time options are increasingly available.

== See also ==
- Bachelor of Divinity (BD)
- Master of Divinity (MDiv)
- Master of Theology (ThM)
- Doctor of Ministry (DMin)
- Doctor of Theology (ThD)
