= Master in Teaching =

Type of master's degree in education

A Master of Arts in Teaching (MAT) or Master of Science in Teaching (MST) is a professional graduate degree designed to prepare individuals for primary or secondary school teaching within a specific subject area. The MAT and MST are typically pre-service degrees aimed at students who are preparing to enter the teaching profession.

== History ==
The Master of Arts in Teaching was first proposed by Harvard University President James B. Conant. In 1934, he advocated for finding a middle-ground between the more 'scholarly' Master of Arts (MA) and the professional degree of Master of Education (MEd).

The degree program began at Harvard in 1937 with 54 students in the original cohort. Early funding came from both the Ford Foundation and the Du Pont Foundation.

== Description ==
There are two general models that MAT or MST degrees follow: a 5th year model, in which students spend one year extra beyond their bachelor's degree to earn a master's degree and an initial teaching license, or a stand-alone program, which usually offers the option part-time weekend and evening courses to accommodate recent college graduates as well as professionals who are changing careers.

Programs generally require a minimum of 30 semester hours beyond the bachelor’s degree, though the exact structure varies by institution. MAT and MST degrees combine graduate-level coursework in a specific academic discipline with formal training in pedagogy, curriculum design, instructional methods, and classroom management. Many programs draw from research in teacher preparation, using supervised clinical experiences, cohort-based learning models, and reflective practice to help candidates develop teaching competencies supported by the education research literature. Because these programs are aligned with state licensure requirements, candidates usually complete a full-time student-teaching placement, often lasting one academic semester, under the supervision of a credentialed mentor teacher.

== Preparation ==
The degree is commonly pursued by individuals intending to teach at the middle or secondary level, where deeper subject specialization is required. By first completing an undergraduate major in a discipline such as mathematics, English, science, or history and then completing the MAT or MST, candidates develop both disciplinary expertise and the pedagogical skills needed to teach that content effectively.
