= Master of Liberal Arts =

Master's degree

A Master of Liberal Arts (MLA, ALM or MLibArts) is a master's degree conferred by higher education institutions following graduate study either (in the US) graduate study or (in the UK) as an integrated undergraduate degree. Universities offering a master of liberal arts include the University of Bristol, the University of Chicago, Harvard University, Johns Hopkins University, the University of Pennsylvania and Queen's University Belfast. While most institutions in the US use the abbreviation MLA and those in the UK use MLibArts, Harvard uses ALM (Latin: Artium Liberalium Magister).
