= Master of Engineering Management =

MEM

A Master of Engineering Management (MEM) (also called Master of Management Engineering) is a professional master's degree that bridges the gap between the field of engineering or technology and the field of business management. Engineering management is a multidisciplinary field that seeks to address problems associated with complex engineering operations or systems along with the business. MEM graduate programs are grounded in principles such as data analytics, machine learning, product management, product design, operations, and supply chain management. Harvard Business Review found that in 2018 more of the top-performing 100 global CEOs have engineering degrees than have MBAs.

== Courses ==
Core courses that make up a MEM program can be found in an MBA program as well; courses such as Marketing, Intellectual Property, Business Law, Finance, Accounting and Management are examples of courses that are utilized within both an MBA program and a MEM program. The focus of students engaged in a Master of Business Administration graduate program is business-centric: teaching students how to make informed decisions that would impact business (large and small), but with little or no emphasis on the technological aspects of the business.

== Accreditation ==
Until recently, there has not been an extensive amount of collaboration among different colleges and universities. However, that has begun to change with two major accreditation bodies that have sought to bring rigor and structure to the Engineering Management graduate degree programs: American Society of Engineering Management (ASEM), and Master of Engineering Management Programs Consortium (MEMPC).

=== American Society of Engineering Management (ASEM) ===
ASEM states that "program is designed to provide recognition to those programs that excel in offering education at the Master’s level that meet the rigorous standards of ASEM. It also provides an excellent mechanism to assess the state of an existing Master’s program relative to ASEM standards and is especially useful for new Master’s programs just getting started."

=== Master of Engineering Management Programs Consortium (MEMPC) ===
The Master of Engineering Management Programs Consortium (MEMPC) is a dedicated group of forward-thinking universities working together to promote engineering management programs to students and organizations.

Based on US News University Rankings 2025, the national rankings for these universities in the consortium are as follows:

1. Massachusetts Institute of Technology - 2nd
2. Northwestern University - 6th
3. Duke University - 6th
4. Johns Hopkins University - 6th
5. Cornell University - 11th
6. Dartmouth College - 15th
7. University of Southern California - 27th
8. Tufts University - 37th
9. Purdue University - 46rd
