= Doctor of Information Technology =

The Doctor of Information Technology (DIT) is a research-oriented professional doctoral degree offered by some universities. It is of the same academic level as traditional PhD; however, DIT research focuses more on industry practice than on theoretical framework. Upon successful completion, the title of "Doctor" is awarded and the post-nominals of DIT can be used.

== Institutions offering DIT degrees ==
=== Australia ===
- Charles Sturt University
- Edith Cowan University
- Monash University
- Murdoch University
- Queensland University of Technology
- University of Ballarat
- University of New South Wales
- University of South Australia

=== Italy ===
- University of Parma
- Sapienza University of Rome
- Mediterranea University of Reggio Calabria

=== Malaysia ===
- Universiti Teknikal Malaysia Melaka

=== Namibia ===
- University of Namibia

=== Philippines ===
- AMA University Quezon City, Philippines
- Angeles University Foundation
- Colegio de San Juan de Letran Calamba (Laguna)
- De La Salle University
- Divine Word College of Laoag
- La Consolacion University Philippines (Bulacan)
- St. Linus University
- St. Paul University - Tuguegarao
- Technological Institute of the Philippines
- University of the Cordilleras

=== United States ===
- Aspen University
- Atlantic International University
- Capella University
- City University of Seattle
- George Mason University
- Middle Georgia State University
- MIT
- Trine University
- University of Texas, San Antonio
- Walden University

=== Mexico ===
- University of Guadalajara
- Popular Autonomous University of Puebla
