= CSCMP Supply Chain Process Standards =

The Council of Supply Chain Management Professionals' (CSCMP) Supply Chain Process Standards present an outline or framework for managing processes which are typically found to be involved in performing supply chain related activities, and a set of standardised activities described in two levels of maturity - the "suggested minimum" and "best practice" for each process. The standards were created for the Council of Supply Chain Management Professionals by Supply Chain Visions, a supply chain process and measures consulting firm.

The intent of the standards is to provide practitioners, educators and consultants with a reference tool to help companies identify potential gaps across a broad spectrum of their supply chain processes. Practitioners can use this tool to identify process strengths and weaknesses, and then focus their attention on those areas where improvement efforts will drive the most benefit. Results can be shared and compared (with discretion) with other organizations in a supply chain to improve overall effectiveness.

The second edition of the Standards utilizes the American Productivity & Quality Center Process Classification Framework to present the minimum and best practice attributes. The third edition was published in 2018.

== Contents ==
The standards uses a numbering scheme where each process element is referred to by categories, process groups, processes, and activities.

- Category: The highest level within the standards is indicated by whole numbers (e.g., 1.0)
- Process Group: Items with one decimal number (e.g., 1.1) are considered a process group.
- Process: Items with two decimal numbers (e.g., 1.1.1) are considered processes.
- Activity: Items with three decimal numbers (e.g., 1.1.1.1) are considered activities within a process.

For each activity there is a description of an associated practice in two levels of maturity.

1. Suggested Minimum
2. Typical Best Practice

The Standards were compiled by Supply Chain Visions utilizing academic research, as well as on-site observations of companies in practice. In addition, a thorough validation process was used, where leading subject-matter experts (SMEs) in the profession reviewed and validated the accuracy of the Standards.

Currently in its third edition, the Standards covers a broad spectrum of supply chain processes and activities—including over 2,600 best and minimum practice statements, which is an increase of 40% over the first edition—derived from research into current cross-industry standards. To more accurately reflect today's supply chain practices, 30% of the statements in the first edition have also been revised.

CSCMP worked with over 420 SMEs in developing the first revision of the Standards. Many of the same SMEs and many new SMEs participated in the review of the second edition of the Standards. The range of SMEs included academics, researchers, practitioners, and consultants who are widely considered experts in the field of supply chain management. The response was extraordinary. SMEs provided over 34% of the new content of the Standards, helped to revise 38% of the practice statements to make them more accurate and current, and validated the suggested minimum process standards and typical best practices descriptions in the Standards. The Standards represent a unique, broad-based, cross-industry repository of supply chain knowledge.
