= Master of Corporate Communication =

Master of Corporate Communication (MCC), or Master of Science in Corporate Communication (MSc.CC), is a post-graduate master's degree designed to prepare communication professionals who in time will function as corporate communication officer (CCO) at a strategic level in the organization. The MCC program structure and admissions are similar to that of the Master of Business Administration and Master of Science in Management degrees. The equivalent of MCC at some universities is Master's in Communication, Master (of Arts) in Public Relations, Master (of Science) in Communication Management.

== Admission ==
B-school MCC admission committees normally evaluate applicants based on resume, letters of recommendation, work experiences, as well as by a candidate's bachelor's degree GPA and GPA of graduate studies if applicable.

Based on these indicators, the committee decides if the applicant can handle the academic rigor of the program and demonstrate considerable leadership potential. The committee also looks for applicants that can improve diversity in the classroom as well as contribute positively to the student body as a whole.

== Programme structure ==
The MCC structure varies from program to program, but typically resembles one of the five major types of MBAs (distance-learning, part-time, accelerated, two-year, or executive).

The MCC program for professionals often resembles one of a distance-learning, part-time, accelerated, or two-year MBA program. Most programs begin with a set of required courses and then offer more specialized courses two thirds of the way through the program.

== Graduation requirements ==
Graduation requirements are different for full-time MCC program from that for executive professionals. Total number of credits required for graduation in regular MCC program may differ from one university to another. However, usually the required number of credits for master program in countries practicing the Bologna system of education is no less than 120 ECTS. The number of credits for executive master programs is usually not less than 60 ECTS, depending on the university.

== Europe ==
In 2008, the Master of Corporate Communication Program at the Rotterdam School of Management was accredited by the NVAO, the accreditation organisation of the Netherlands and Flanders, to hold the Master of Science in Corporate Communication (MSc. CC) title.
