= Master of Management =

Master's degree awarded for post-graduate study in business management

The Master of Management, or Master in Management (MM, MiM, or MMgt), is a master's degree comprising one or two years graduate level coursework in business management.

In terms of content, it is similar to the Master of Business Administration (MBA) degree as it contains identical management courses but is open to prospective postgraduate candidates with no job experience unlike MBA programs which have longer course credit requirements and only accept mid-career professionals. In many cases it is synonymous with the Master of Science in Management (MSM or MiM) and is also related to the Master of Science in Commerce (MS-Comm or MS-Com).

As the program is designed for students interested in entering leadership roles, the degree attracts applicants from diverse academic disciplines.

A global survey of business schools offering MIM programs shows a robust growth in applications in times of global recession triggered by COVID-19. This growth in applications shows the demand for pre-experience programs among domestic and international candidates preparing for management careers.

== Program structure ==
The mode of delivery of the program can be full-time, part-time, distance-learning, accelerated, or executive.

The MM program for younger professionals with limited professional experience often resembles an MBA program. It typically prepares students to handle management issues in all areas of business, with the option to concentrate or specialize in one area. Most programs begin with a set of required courses and then offer more specialized courses two thirds of the way through the program. Topics in the MM program often accounting, finance, business administration, international business, marketing management, supply chain management, human resources, nonprofit management, and entrepreneurship.

The MM program for senior professionals with managerial experience (typically 10+ years) often resembles an Executive MBA (EMBA) program. It typically prepares students to handle the tasks associated with interdisciplinary business-related subjects such as ethical decision making, business law, global business values, workplace security, corporate crime, and employee motivation.

== Admissions ==
Business school admission committees normally evaluate applicants based on GPA score (and graduate GPA if applicable), résumés, letters of recommendation, essays, and personal interviews. Based on these indicators, a committee decides if the applicant is suitable for the academic profile of the program, can demonstrate considerable leadership potential, and contribute positively to the student body of the school as a whole.

== See also ==
- Doctor of Management
- Master of Business Administration
- Master of Science in Management
- Bachelor of Management Studies
