= Master of Science in Leadership =

The Master of Science in Leadership (MSL) is a master's degree in leadership studies that is offered by a college of business. It is an alternative to the traditional Master of Business Administration (MBA) degree. The MSL degree requirements may include business/management courses that are required in an MBA program.

This degree program concentrates heavily on leader-follower interactions, cross-cultural communications, coaching, influencing, team development, leading organizational changes, strategic thinking, project leadership, and behavioral motivation theories. It does not emphasize financial or quantitative analysis, marketing, or accounting which are common in MBA programs. The degree program is appealing to businesspeople in well-established careers. The MSL degree is similar to the Master of Science in Organizational Leadership (MSOL) degree or the Master of Leadership Sciences degree offered by the National School of Leadership in India.
