= Master of Information System Management =

The Master in Information System Management, also known as Masters in Management Information Systems or Master of Science in Information System Management, is a professional Master's degree in Information Systems, Information Technology, Computer Science and Management. The degree is also known as Master of Science in Information Management or Master of Information Systems with curriculum overlap (abbreviated M.ISM, MS.IM, M.IS or similar), although MISM, MMIS and MSISM have significantly more business/management content than Masters in IS.

== Curriculum ==
Though unique to each degree-granting institution, an MISM will often include most, if not all, of the following:

- Information systems modeling

Information System – Concepts (data, information, System Modeling) Functional components of computer;

- Project management
- Databases
- Computer networks
- Economics & Statistics
- Business concepts
- Electives
