= Master of Science in Management =

Post-graduate degree

A Master of Science in Management (abbreviated as MS Management or MSM) is a professional degree with a focus on management.

In terms of content, it is similar to the Master of Business Administration (MBA) degree as it contains identical management courses but is open to prospective postgraduate candidates at any level in their career unlike MBA programs that have longer course credit requirements and only accept mid-career professionals. In many cases it is synonymous with the Master of Management (MiM) and is also related to the Master of Science in Commerce (MS-Comm or MS-Com).

== Subjects ==
Graduates holding an MSc in Management have commonly studied the following subjects:

- Business Ethics
- Corporate and Business Strategy
- Economics
- Engineering management
- Entrepreneurship
- Finance
- Financial Management and managerial accounting
- Human Resources Management and Organizational Behavior
- Management Information Systems
- Management Theory
- Marketing or Marketing Management
- Operations Management and Supply Chain Management
- Protected Area Management
- Personal student dissertation (thesis)

In Canada, a highly specialized MSc in Management is also quite common (ex: MSc in Management in Finance and Accounting). These degrees are meant to provide students with a highly specialized set of skills for industry or for further academic study.

== Comparison to MBA ==
As is the case with the MBA degree, as the number of schools granting MSc in Management degrees has grown, so has the diversity of characteristics defining these programs. In most cases, the MSc in Management is an academic degree with no or some requirements for previous job experience, while the MBA is also a professional degree for persons with minimum 2–3 years job experience or 2nd class lower division honorees. However, there are also schools where the MSM degree is granted only to managers with extensive (typically 10 years or more) of work and managerial experience. Whereas MBA programs are open to people from all academic disciplines; about one third of the MSc in Management programs worldwide require a first degree in business or economics.

Some claim the MSc degree is more theory-oriented, and some programs do focus on specific skill set development for managers, while the MBA degree can be more practice-oriented and financially focused. In some schools, the MSc in Management degree studies the academic discipline of Management, while the MBA degree studies the academic discipline of Business Administration. Thus, some MSc degree programs focus on research in a specialized area, while the MBA degree would place more emphasis on strategy. According to one school, "While the MBA program focuses on the practical application of management theory, the M.Sc. in Management will provide for an advanced-level conceptual foundation in a student’s chosen field, and allow for the pursuit of highly focused research through a master’s level thesis."

Both degrees contain strong professional focus and are both very well suited for professionals wishing to improve positions in their respective industries. Most MSc in Management programs contain very directed content geared towards development of a particular set of leadership skills for the mid-career professional looking to improve their credentials. Both the MBA and the MSc in Management can be completed online or in-person in roughly 1-2 years depending on the school providing the programs.

Persons admitted to the degree of MSc in Management are entitled to add the designation MSc or MSM after their names (e.g. Domeng Gomez MSc), while those holding an MBA can add the designation MBA (e.g. Domeng Gomez MBA). While the MBA degree was started in the United States, the MSc in Management degree is of European origin. There seems to be a tendency that the demand for MBA is saturated whereas the demand for Masters in Management is increasing.

== See also ==
- MPhil
- Master of Business Administration (MBA)
- Master of Management (MM)
- Master of Science in Finance
- Master of Commerce
- Doctor of Management
