= Master of Science in Information Systems =

Type of graduate degree

The Master of Science in Information Systems (MSIS), the Master of Science in Management Information Systems (MSMIS) and Masters in Management Information Systems (MMIS) are specialized master's degree programs usually offered in a university's College of Business and in integrated Information Science and Technology colleges. The MSIS degree is designed for those managing design and development information technology, especially the information systems development process.

The MSIS degree is thought to be functionally equivalent to a Master of Information Systems/Technology Management; however, the two are distinguishable in that the latter has much more equitable composition of information science/systems, and business/management. MSMIS and MMIS degrees are recognized by the Association to Advance Collegiate Schools of Business (AACSB) and the Accreditation Council for Business Schools and Programs (ACBSP).

A joint committee of Association for Information Systems (AIS) and Association for Computing Machinery (ACM) members developed a model curriculum for the MSIS in 2006.
