= Bachelor of Computer Information Systems =

Bachelor's degree program

The Bachelor of Computer Information Systems, also known as Bachelor of Computer & Information Science by the University of Oregon and The Ohio State University, (abbreviated BSc CIS) is an undergraduate or bachelor's degree that focuses on practical applications of technology to support organizations while adding value to their offerings. In order to apply technology effectively in this manner, a broad range of subjects are covered, such as communications, business, networking, software design, and mathematics. This degree encompasses the entirety of the Computing field and therefore is very useful when applying to computing positions of various sectors.

Some computer information systems programs have received accreditation from ABET, the recognized U.S. accreditor of college and university programs in applied science, computing, engineering, and technology.
