= Bachelor's degree =

Undergraduate educational qualification

A bachelor's degree (from Medieval Latin baccalaureus; or baccalaureate, from Modern Latin baccalaureatus) is an undergraduate degree awarded by higher education institutions upon completion of a course of study lasting three to six years (depending on the institution and academic discipline). The two most common bachelor's degrees are the Bachelor of Arts (BA) and the Bachelor of Science (BS or BSc). In some institutions and educational systems, certain bachelor's degrees can only be taken as graduate or postgraduate educations after a first degree has been completed, although more commonly the successful completion of a bachelor's degree is a prerequisite for further courses such as a master's or a doctorate.

In countries with qualifications frameworks, bachelor's degrees are normally one of the major levels in the framework (sometimes two levels where non-honours and honours bachelor's degrees are considered separately). However, some qualifications titled bachelor's degree may be at other levels (e.g., MBBS) and some qualifications with non-bachelor's titles may be classified as bachelor's degrees (e.g. the Scottish Ancients MA and Canadian MD).

The term bachelor in the 12th century referred to a knight bachelor, who was too young or poor to gather vassals under his own banner. By the end of the 13th century, it was also used by junior members of guilds or universities. By folk etymology or wordplay, the word baccalaureus came to be associated with bacca lauri ("laurel berry"); this is in reference to laurels being awarded for academic success or honours.

Under the British system, and those influenced by it, undergraduate academic degrees are differentiated between honours degrees (sometimes denoted by the addition of "(Hons)" after the degree abbreviation) and non-honours degrees (known variously as pass degrees, ordinary degrees or general degrees). An honours degree generally requires a higher academic standard than a pass degree, and in some systems an additional year of study beyond the non-honours bachelor's. Some countries, such as Australia, New Zealand, South Africa, and Canada, have a postgraduate "bachelor with honours" degree. This may be taken as a consecutive academic degree, continuing on from the completion of a bachelor's degree program in the same field, or as part of an integrated honours program. Programs like these typically require completion of a full year-long research thesis project.

== Scheme of completion periods in each country ==
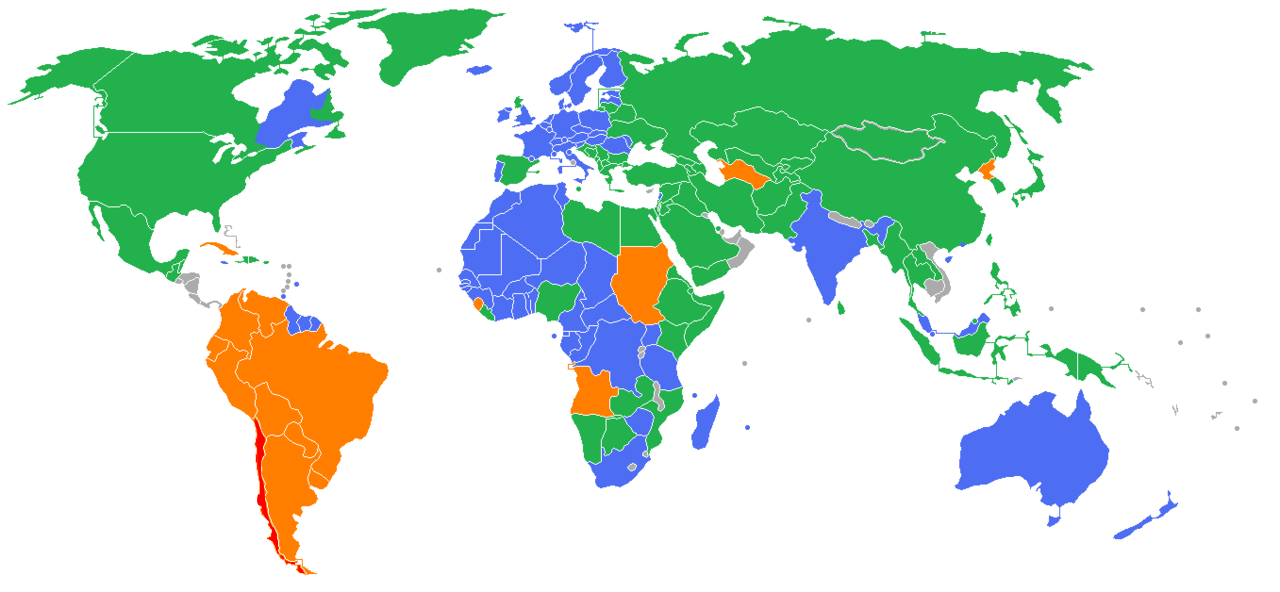
3 years 4 years 5 years 6 years

The map shows how long it takes for students in different countries to get a bachelor's degree. It generally takes between 3 and 6 years.

== Variations ==
=== Africa ===
In most African countries, the university systems follow the model of their former colonizing power. For example, the Nigerian university system is similar to the British system, while the Ivorian system is akin to the French.

==== Algeria ====
Bachelor's degrees in Algerian universities are called "الليسانس" in Arabic or la licence in French; the degree normally takes three years to complete and is a part of the LMD ("licence", "master", "doctorat") reform, students can enroll in a bachelor's degree program in different fields of study after having obtained their baccalauréat (the national secondary education test). The degree is typically identical to the program of France's universities, as specified in the LMD reform. Bachelor's degree programs cover most of the fields in Algerian universities, except some fields, such as Medicine and Pharmaceutical Science.

==== Botswana ====
Bachelor's degrees at the University of Botswana normally take four years. The system draws on both British and American models. Degrees are classified as First Class, Second Class Division One (2:1), Second Class Division Two (2:2) and Third as in English degrees, but without being described as honours. The main degrees are named by British tradition (Arts, Science, Law, etc.); in recent years, however, there have been a number of degrees named after specific subjects, such as Bachelor of Library and Information.

==== Kenya ====
In Kenya, university education is supported by the government. A bachelor's degree is awarded to students who successfully complete a three to seven-year course depending on the area of study. For most degree programs, a research project and an internship period after which a report is written by the student is a must before the student is allowed to graduate. In 2012, a number of select colleges were upgraded to university status in a bid to increase the intake of students into degree programs.

==== Morocco ====
In Morocco, a bachelor's degree is referred to as al-ʾijāzah (Arabic, French: licence). The course of study takes three years, which are further divided into two cycles. The first cycle comprises the first, or propaedeutic, year. After successfully completing their first two years, students can pursue either theoretical specialization (études fondamentales) or professional specialization (études professionnelles). The second cycle is one year after whose completion students receive the licence d'études fondamentales or the licence professionnelle. This academic degree system was introduced in September 2003.

==== Nigeria ====
University admission is extremely competitive, with attendant advantages and disadvantages. Nonetheless, it takes four to five years to complete a bachelor's degree. In cases of poor performance, the time limit is double the standard amount of time. For example, one may not study for more than 10 years for a five-year course. Students are normally asked to leave if they must take longer. Nigerian universities offer BSc, BTech (usually from Universities of Technology), BArch (six years), and other specialized undergraduate degrees, such as BEng. Science undergraduate degrees may require six months or a semester dedicated to SIWES (Students Industrial Work Experience Scheme) but it is usually mandatory for all engineering degrees. A semester for project work/thesis is required, not excluding course work, during the bachelor thesis in the final year. The classifications of degrees: first-class, second-class (upper and lower), third-class (with honours; i.e., BSc (Hons)) and a pass (no honours). First- and second-class graduates are immediately eligible for advanced postgraduate degrees (i.e., MSc and PhD), but other classes may be required for an additional postgraduate diploma before such eligibility.

Furthermore, all graduating students are obliged to do the National Youth Service Corps (NYSC) requirement, which usually takes one year, after which they are eligible to pursue higher degrees. The NYSC is a paramilitary service that involves students' being posted to different parts of the country to serve in various capacities. Principal objectives of the NYSC are to forge national cohesion, encourage students to apply their obtained knowledge to solving problems of rural Nigeria, and others. The NYSC was established by law after the Nigerian Civil War.

Polytechnical schools (polytechnics) in Nigeria are not considered universities. They are mandated to educate technicians of high calibre; they offer the OND (ordinary national diploma) and the HND (higher national diploma). The polytechnics focus very strongly on practical technical training. The BSc and HND are compared in engineering circles, but there are significant differences in training philosophies.

Honours degrees in Nigeria are differentiated only on the basis of performance. Honours degrees include the first-class degree, second-class degrees (upper and lower) and the third-class degree, but not the pass. All university students must do an independent research project which applies the knowledge obtained during the previous years of study.

The project work must be submitted in the semester before graduation and usually takes a significant number of points. Further course work is not precluded during the project work, but the courses are fewer and are at an advanced level. Project work is orally defended before the faculty and before peers. In the sciences and engineering a demonstration of the project is usually required. The exceptions are theoretical work.

==== South Africa ====
In South Africa, an honours degree is an additional postgraduate qualification in the same area as the undergraduate major, and requires at least one further year of study as well as a research report.

==== Tunisia ====
In Tunisia, a bachelor's degree is referred to as al-ʾijāzah in Arabic, or la license in French; the degree takes three years to complete and is a part of the LMD (license, master, doctorat) reform, students can enroll in a bachelor's degree program in different fields of study after having obtained their baccalauréat (the national secondary education test). The degree is typically identical to the program of France's universities, as specified in the LMD reform. Most universities in Tunisia offer the 3-year bachelor's degree, except some fields, which are Medicine, Pharmacy, Engineering, Architecture and Bachelor of Science in Business Administration, solely offered by Tunis Business School and lasts 4 years.

=== Americas ===
The region typically confers associates, bachelor's, master's, doctoral, and postdoctoral degrees to graduating students.

==== Argentina ====
University education in Argentina is currently regulated by the Ministry of Human Capital, with the requirements of a Licenciatura or bachelor's degree, also referred to as a university degree program lasting 4, 5, or more years. These programs can be equivalent to professional degrees, such as law, medicine, engineering, psychology, education, arts, architecture, industrial design, or bachelor's degrees more oriented towards research and teaching in a specific field of science. The undergraduate degrees recognized by the Higher Education Law (LES) are programs that must have more than 2,600 hours of instruction, under the guidance of the National Commission for University Evaluation and Accreditation (CONEAU). The current regulations govern the Institutional Distance Education System, Ministerial Resolution No. 2641-E/2017 and Ministerial Resolution No. 4389/2017. There is no distinction between universities and non-university institutions, such as teacher training colleges.

==== Brazil ====
In Brazil, a bachelor's degree takes from three years to six years to complete depending on the course load and the program. A bachelor's degree is the title sought by Brazilians in order to be a professional in a certain area of human knowledge. Master's and doctoral degrees are additional degrees for those seeking an academic career or a specific understanding of a field.

Even without a formal adhesion to the Bologna system, a Brazilian "bachelor's" would correspond to a European "first cycle". A Brazilian "bachelor's" takes three to six years for completion, as well as usually a written monograph or concluding project, in the same way that a European bachelor's can be finished in three to four years, after which time Europeans may embark on a one- to two-year 2nd cycle program usually called a "master's", according to the Bologna Process.

Depending on programs and personal choices, Europeans can achieve a master's degree in as little as four years (a three-year bachelor's and a one-year master's) and as long as six years (a four-year bachelor's, a two-year master's) of higher education. In Brazil it would be possible to have a specialization "lato-sensu" degree—which differs from a Brazilian "stricto-sensu" master's degree—in as little as three years (two years for a "tecnólogo" degree and an additional year for a specialization) or as long as eight years (six years for professional degrees, plus two years for a master's "stricto-sensu" degree—typical in medicine or engineering).

==== Canada ====
Education in Canada is governed independently by each province and territory; however, a common framework for degrees was agreed to by the Council of Ministers of Education, Canada, in 2007. This adopted descriptors for bachelor's, master's and doctoral degrees that were deliberately similar to those defined by the Bologna Process.

Under the framework, four general forms of bachelor's degree are defined: general programs that provide a broad education and prepare graduates for graduate-entry professional programs or employment generally; in-depth academic programs in a specific subject that prepare graduates for postgraduate study in the field or employment generally; applied programs that concentrate on a mastery of practice rather than knowledge; and professional programs, often (but not exclusively) graduate-entry, that prepare graduates to practice as professionals in a specific field. This last category includes graduate-entry degrees titled as if they were doctorates, such as MD, JD and DDS degrees—despite their names, these are considered bachelor's degrees.

Bachelor's degrees may take either three or four years to complete and are awarded by colleges and universities. In many universities and colleges, bachelor's degrees are differentiated either as (ordinary) bachelor's or as honours bachelor's degrees. The term "honours" is an academic distinction, which indicates that students must achieve their bachelor's degree with a sufficiently high overall grade point average; in addition, some programs may require more education than non-honours programs. The honours degrees are sometimes designated with the abbreviation in brackets of "(Hon(s))".

Going back in history, the Bachelor with Honours (Latin baccalaureatus cum honore, French: baccalauréat spécialisé) was traditionally taken as the highest undergraduate degree. The program requires at least 4 years of studies, with strong emphasis on the research-based Honours Seminar Thesis which is considered approximately equivalent to a formal master's thesis. Universities show the academic degree as well as the possible honours distinction (Latin honours) on the diploma (e.g., "BACCALAUREATUS ARTIUM CUM HONORE ... CUM LAUDE").

In Quebec, students have to take a minimum of two years of college before entering, for example, a three-year Bachelor of Science (BSc) or a four-year Bachelor of Engineering (BEng) program. As a consequence, there is no de jure "honours degree" (although some universities market some of their programs as being de facto honours degrees in their English-language materials) but there are some specializations called "concentrations" in French, which are mostly taken as optional courses.

In the province of Ontario, the most bachelor's degrees offered by Ontario universities are academic in nature. In contrast, Ontario legislation requires bachelor's degrees offered by Ontario colleges to be applied and vocationally focused.

==== Costa Rica, El Salvador, and Venezuela ====
In these countries, there are two titles that should not be confused:

1. High school students who pass their bachillerato or high school exams obtain a certificate of Bachiller de Educación Secundaria (not the same as a 'Bachelor' for higher education degrees), which is needed in order to enter a university and is usually requested by companies in their profiles.
2. University students obtain an American equivalent bachelor's degree in their respective fields after completing four years of education, and a licenciatura licentiate degree completing one more year of studies (and meeting other requisites unique to each institution, it is common to write a dissertation on the professional field), this enables them to work as professionals in their chosen areas; for example, a Profesor en Enseñanza Secundaria ("Licentiate degree in secondary education") enables a person to work as a high school teacher. Currently, the trend is for universities not to offer a bachelor's degree and to offer instead a licentiate's or "ingeniero" degree after five years of education.

==== Mexico ====
Bachelor's degrees may take an average of five years (from four to five years) to complete depending on the course load and the program, they are awarded by colleges and universities. Medicine is from 6 to 7 years. Each college has its own curriculum and requirements with an emphasis of their choice, governed independently by each state of the republic. After finishing all the subjects the student require a final work, which means the completion of particular honours seminars, research and development or a written thesis in a particular field. Mexico's regulations established as an obligation in order to receive their license and title the fulfillment of a "social service" to the nation (usually for those who finished their studies in a public institution) as a remuneration to society in the form of social actions, for the benefits, as students, were received during training. This requirement takes about six months to one year depending on the type of degree. Bachelor's degree should not be falsely related with its Spanish cognate "bachiller", which designate a prerequisite for matriculate in a career or bachelor studies. The official name for a bachelor's degree in Mexico is "licenciado" and such studies are referred as "licenciatura".

Bachelor's degrees should not be confused with Engineering Degrees, where an Ingeniería is prefixed to the name and requires additional courses for certification as an Engineer.

==== United States ====
Bachelor's degrees in the United States are typically designed to be completed in four years of full-time study, which typically represents an average of 15 hours of weekly instruction per four-month semester, two semesters per year, for a total of eight semesters and 120 instructional credit hours, although some programs, such as engineering or architecture, may take five years, and some universities and colleges allow students, usually with the help of summer school, who are taking many classes each semester or who have existing credit from high school Advanced Placement or International Baccalaureate course exams, to complete them more rapidly.

Some US colleges and universities have a separate academic track known as an "honours" or "scholars" program, generally offered to the top percentile of students, based on GPA, that offers more challenging courses or more individually directed seminars or research projects instead or in addition to the standard core curriculum. Those students are awarded the same bachelor's degree as students completing the standard curriculum but with the notation in cursu honorum on the transcript and the diploma. Usually, the above Latin honours are separate from the notation for this honours course, but a student in the honours course generally must maintain grades worthy of at least the cum laude notation anyway. Hence, a graduate might receive a diploma Artium Baccalaureatum rite or Artium Baccalaureatum summa cum laude in the regular course or Artium Baccalaureatum summa cum laude in cursu honorum in the honours course.

If the student has completed the requirements for an honours degree only in a particular discipline (e.g., English language and literature), the degree is designated accordingly (e.g., "BA with Honours in English"). In this case, the degree candidate will complete the normal curriculum for all subjects except the selected discipline ("English", in the preceding example). The requirements in either case usually require completion of particular honours seminars, independent research at a level higher than usually required (often with greater personal supervision by faculty than usual), and a written honours thesis in the major subject.

Many universities and colleges in the United States award bachelor's degrees with Latin honours, usually (in ascending order) cum laude ("with honour/praise"), magna cum laude ("with great honour/praise"), summa cum laude ("with highest honour/praise"), and the occasionally seen maxima cum laude ("with maximal honour/praise"). Requirements for such notations of honours generally include minimum grade point averages (GPA), with the highest average required for the summa distinction (or maxima, when that distinction is present). In the case of some schools, such as Bates College, Carleton College, Colby College, Middlebury College, Guilford College, Franklin College Switzerland, and larger universities like the University of Virginia, Princeton University, North Carolina State University, University of Massachusetts Amherst, a senior thesis for degrees in the humanities or laboratory research for natural science (and sometimes social science) degrees is also required. Six notable exceptions are Reed College, Massachusetts Institute of Technology, The Evergreen State College, Sarah Lawrence College, Bard College, and Bennington College, which do not have deans' lists, Latin honours recognitions, or undergraduate honours programs or subjects.

Starting in 2023, some colleges and universities began offering three-year bachelor's programs. As of late 2025, 70 institutions had the programs or planned to. A three-year degree could be obtained with additional credits during the regular school year and summer courses. Most reduced the number of required credits, identifying the program as "accelerated pathways" on the transcript. Reasons for choosing a three-year program include the increasing cost of education, and the desire of students not to take courses they did not need.

=== Asia ===
==== Bangladesh ====
In Bangladesh, universities and colleges award three- and four-year degrees (three-year degrees courses are called pass courses and four-year degree courses are called honours courses) in science and business BSc, BBS, BBA, four-year and three months, etc. and three- and four-year degrees in arts (BA, BSS, etc.). Engineering universities provide four-year degree programs for bachelor's degree courses of study (BSc in Eng and BSc). Medical colleges have five-year degree programmes (MBBS, BDS). In law education there is a two-year LLB degree after completing three years in a BA program for a total of five years of study. There is also a four-year LLB honours degree. The Bachelor of Architecture (BArch) and Bachelor of Pharmacy (BPharm) are professional degrees awarded to students who complete a five-year course of study in the field at some universities. All of these programs begin after achieving the Higher Secondary Certificate (HSC – in total 12 years of school education).

==== China ====
There are 13 kinds of statutory bachelor's degrees in China: Bachelor of Philosophy, Economics, Laws, Education, Arts, History, Science, Engineering, Agriculture, Medicine, Management, Military Science, and Fine Arts.

Since the undergraduate education system in China is modeled after its American counterpart, all of the degrees are adapted from those of the United States except for the issuing of the degree certificate. Once a student has fulfilled their course requirements, a "graduate certificate" will be given. In order to get the degree, a student must finish and pass the dissertation stage; only then will they be awarded a degree certified by the Ministry of Education of the People's Republic of China.

Most bachelor's degree in China needs four years to complete, with the exception that the Bachelor of Medicine degree requires five years. Although some colleges (Chinese: 专科学校), vocational colleges (Chinese: 职业学院) and colleges in some universities offer two or three year programs for students, they can not graduate with any degree, except for those who pass the upgrade exam during college and then study an extra two-year undergraduate course at another university and pass a dissertation.

Any Chinese citizen can also get a bachelor's degree via the undergraduate majors of the Self-Taught Higher Education Examinations (Chinese: 高等教育自学考试).

==== Indonesia ====
In Indonesia, most of the current bachelor's degrees are domain-specific degrees. Therefore, there are more than 20 bachelor's degrees. For instance, S.Psi. for Sarjana Psikologi (literally translated as "Bachelor of Psychology/BPsy, BA"), S.T. for Sarjana Teknik (literally translated as "Bachelor of Engineering"), S.Si. for Sarjana Sains (literally translated as "Bachelor of Science"), S.Farm. for Sarjana Farmasi (literally translated as "Bachelor of Pharmacy"), S.E. for Sarjana Ekonomi (literally translated as "Bachelor of Economy"), S.Kom. for Sarjana Ilmu Komputer (literally translated as "Bachelor of Computer Science"), S.S. for Sarjana Sastra (literally translated as "Bachelor of Literature") or S.Sos. for Sarjana Ilmu Sosial (literally translated as "Bachelor of Social Sciences"). In the past, the Indonesian academic system adopted the old European/western degrees, such as the Ir (insinyur from Dutch ingenieur) for an engineering degree and the common academic degree (doktorandus from Dutch and ultimately Latin doctorandus) for a degree in either social or natural sciences.

=== Europe ===
==== Austria ====
The historical situation in Austria was very similar to that in Germany, with the traditional first degrees being the magister and the diplom, which are master's-level qualifications. From 2004, bachelor's degrees have been reintroduced as part of the Bologna Process reforms. These can be studied at universities, leading to a bachelor's degree (BA or BSc) after three or four years, and at Fachhochschulen (universities of applied science), leading to a bachelor (FH) after three years.

==== Belgium ====
Education in Belgium is run by the language communities, with separate higher education systems being administered by the Flemish Community and the French Community. Both systems have been reformed to align with the Bologna Process, the Flemish Community from 2003 and the French Community from 2004. In the Flemish Community, bachelor's degrees may be either academic or professional. These degrees last three years, and may be followed in both cases by an advanced bachelor diploma (French: Bachelier de spécialisation, lit. 'Specialized Bachelor'; Dutch: Bachelor-na-bachelor, lit. 'Bachelor-after-bachelor'), lasting one year (cf. the Australian bachelor honours degree). All of these qualifications are at level 6 on the EQF, to which the Flemish Qualification Framework was referenced in June 2011. In the French Community, universities award grade de bachelier (3 years) as the equivalent of bachelor's degrees. Outside of universities, professional programs may be type long (long type) or type court (short type), both of which are offered at hautes ecoles and ecoles supérieures des arts. The long type takes in a grade de bachelier (type long) (3 years), which is followed by a master degree (1 or 2 years), while the short type has a grade de bachelier professionnalisant (type court) (3 years), which may be followed by a bachelier de spécialisation (1 year). All bachelier degrees (including the bachelier de spécialisation) are equivalent to level 6 of the EQF, but have not been formally referenced.

==== Croatia ====
Most public universities and community colleges in Croatia today offer a three-year bachelor program, which can be followed up typically with a two-year master's (graduate) program. All bachelor's degrees in Croatia are professional. For distinction, in universities the title is "univ. bacc." (university bachelor) and in community colleges is just "bacc.".

Zagreb School of Economics and Management has a four-year bachelor's program. Academies that specialize in the arts, e.g. the Academy of Fine Arts in Zagreb, have four-year bachelor's programs followed by a one-year master's.

==== Cyprus ====
Higher education in Cyprus is aligned with the Bologna Process and governed by the Cyprus Agency of Quality Assurance and Accreditation in Higher Education (CYQAA). Bachelor's degrees at Cypriot universities are four years in duration, corresponding to 240 ECTS credits.

Public universities in Cyprus comprise the University of Cyprus, the Cyprus University of Technology and the Open University of Cyprus, all of which admit students through the annual Pancyprian Examinations. Private universities, including the European University Cyprus and the University of Nicosia, admit students on the basis of academic records and offer programs in Greek and English.

==== Czechia ====
Historically, the baccalaureus was the undergraduate degree awarded to students who graduated from the course of trivium (grammar, dialectic and rhetoric) at a faculty of liberal arts (either at the Charles University or at the University of Olomouc). It was a necessary prerequisite to continue either with the faculty of liberal arts (quadrivium leading to a master's degree and further to a doctoral degree) or to study at one of the other three historical faculties—law, medicine or theology.

A bachelor's degree, abbreviated BcA, in the field of fine arts, and Bc (Bakalář in Czech) in other fields is awarded for accredited undergraduate programs at universities and colleges.

The vast majority of undergraduate programmes offered in the Czech Republic have a standard duration of three years.

In the Czech tertiary education system, most universities and colleges today offer a three-year bachelor program, which can be followed up typically with a two-year master's (graduate) program. Some specializations, such as doctors of medicine and veterinary doctors, hold exceptions from the general system in that the only option is a six-year master's program with no bachelor stage (graduate with title doctor). This is due mainly to the difficulty of meaningfully splitting up the education for these specialisations.

==== Denmark ====
The bachelor's degree was re-introduced at universities in Denmark in 1993, after the original degree (baccalaureus) was abandoned in 1775. The bachelor's degree is awarded after three or four years of study at a university and follows a scheme quite similar to the British one. Two bachelor's degrees are given at the university level today:

- Bachelor of Science (BSc), awarded to students with main focus on scientific, medical, or technical areas;
- Bachelor of Arts (BA), awarded to students whose main focus is on humanistic, theological, or jurisprudence areas.

However, both in the business and the academic world in Denmark, the bachelor's degree is still considered to be "the first half" of a master's (candidatus). It is often not considered a degree in its own right, despite the politicians' best attempts to make it more accepted.

The bachelor's degree has also been used since the late 1990s in a number of areas like nursing and teaching. Usually referred to as a "professional bachelor" (Danish: professionsbachelor), these degrees usually require 3 to 4 1/2 years of combined theoretical and practical study at a "professional university college" (Danish: professionshøjskole) or "business academy" (Danish: "erhvervsakademier"). These professional bachelor's degrees do grant access to some university master's program. These professional bachelor's degrees are considered to be a full education.

==== France ====
The traditional bachelor's degree is the equivalent of the French Licence three-year degree. Since the new European system of 2004 LMD Bologna process was founded, it has become standard to recognize a bachelor's degree over three years with a licence degree, a master's degree over five years, and a doctorate over eight years.

Some private institutions are however literally naming their degrees bachelor. Some of these bachelor are "Diplômes visés" (often delivered by specialized private schools, such as business, design, film or journalism schools), others are "Diplômes certifiés" by the French State. The others are not accredited by the French State.

==== Germany ====
Historically, the bachelor's degree, called "Bakkalaureus", existed in Germany since the late Middle Ages. But it was abolished by the educational reforms undertaken in 1820. The Abitur degree – the final degree received in school after a specialized 'college phase' of two years – replaced it, and universities only awarded graduate degrees.

The magister degree, a graduate degree, was awarded after five years of study. In 1899, a second graduate degree, the diplom, was introduced when the Technische Hochschulen (TH) received university status. With the introduction of the universities of applied sciences, a shortened version of the latter, referred to as Diplom (FH) and designed to take three to four years, was phased in between 1969 and 1972.

However, in 1998, in order to comply with the European Bologna process, a new educational law reintroduced the bachelor's degree (first degree after three years of study) in Germany. Today, these degrees can be called either "Bakkalaureus" or "bachelor" (in accordance with federal law), but the English term is more common. According to the Bologna model, the bachelor is followed by the post-graduate master's degree of another two years. The traditional degrees of diplom and magister were mostly abolished in 2010, although the diplom still persists in a few subjects and universities and has been reintroduced as alternative degree in some places.

The traditional degrees have been re-mapped to the new European Credit Transfer and Accumulation System (ECTS) point system to make them comparable to the new bachelor's degree. Traditional and Bologna process degrees are ranked as follows in Germany:

- Bachelor: 180, 210, or 240 ECTS points required;
- Diplom FH: 240 ECTS;
- Diplom Uni or TH: 300 ECTS;
- Master: 300 ECTS (including bachelor).

==== Greece ====
The Greek bachelor's degree is called πτυχίο (transliterated to "ptychio"; Greek: πτυχίο; ptychio in dhimotiki from 1976–present; or defunct πτυχίον; ptychion in polytonic, katharevousa up until 1976). It is earned after four to six years of undergraduate studies, depending on the field, and is a first cycle qualification in the Bologna Process with 240 or more ECTS credits. It is placed at level 6 of the national qualifications framework of Greece which is officially named Hellenic Qualification Framework (HQF), which is referenced to level 6 of the European Qualifications Framework. It is classified as a level 6 qualification in the ISCED. The bachelor's degree is provided by all Higher Education Institutions (HEIs), including universities, specialist HEIs, formerly technological educational institutes (TEIs) (1983–2019).

In 1995, it changed TEI six-semester-mode of undergraduate degree programme of studies legally equivalent to an ordinary bachelor's degree (Ord) (3 1/2-year; 210 ECTS, 1983–1995) into nine-semester-mode (4-year; 240 ECTS, 1995–2019). Technical universities and some universities offer a five-year (300 ECTS) undergraduate programme leading to a Δίπλωμα (Greek) Diploma (integrated-master-level-granting, Master's degree equivalent) at Level 7 of the HQF.

==== Hungary ====
In the classic, pre-Bologna educational system, Hungarian academic programs were not divided into bachelor's and master's degrees. However, while an average university (Hungarian: egyetem) degree lasted 5 years, there were undergraduate college (Hungarian: főiskola) degrees obtainable, in either 3 or 4 years of length. These diplomas are today considered to be equivalents of a BA/BSc (undergraduate college) or an MA/MSc (university) degree.

The Bologna System was introduced in 2005, and with the last classes graduating in 2009, it is the sole form of higher education in the country. Bachelor's degrees (Hungarian: alapképzés, "basic degree") usually last 3 years, but there are degrees in certain areas of education – most notably engineering, economics, and some natural sciences – where an additional semester is required, lengthening the program to 3,5 years. While regular master's degrees (Hungarian: mesterképzés, "master degree") are only obtainable with a pre-existing bachelor's degree, the Hungarian system makes notable exceptions with law degrees, teacher's degrees, medical degrees, and some unique fields of study (i.e. forestry engineering at the University of Sopron): these degrees are called non-divisional degrees (Hungarian: osztatlan képzés), and while technically being MA/MSc degrees, they have the same entering criteria as BA/BSc degrees, and have a span of 5 or 6 years.

==== Italy ====
Italian students graduate from high school at age 19, and the current higher education system includes:

- "laurea triennale" (three-year degree) or simply "laurea", corresponds to bachelor's degree. The course takes three years to complete and grants access to graduate degrees.
- "laurea magistrale", corresponds to master's degree and takes two years to complete.
- "laurea magistrale a ciclo unico", (one cycle degree) is a title provided by particular faculties like law school and medical school. It takes 5 to 6 year to complete and grants the access to a profession.

A bachelor's degree holder has the title of "dottore" (doctor)

A master's degree holder has the title of "dottore magistrale" (master doctor)

In order to graduate, students must earn credits (ECTS) and write a thesis for which students have to elaborate on an argument under the supervision of a professor (generally from three to eight ECTS). Graduation marks go from 66 to 110. According to each faculty internal ruling, a lode may be awarded to candidates with a 110/110 mark for recognition of the excellence of the final project.

==== Netherlands ====
In the Netherlands, the bachelor's degree was introduced in 2002 with the change of the Dutch degree system due to the European Bologna process. Until that time, the Dutch universities did not have a Bachelor level degree (although the Candidate's diploma existed until 1982, which was more-or-less of the same level). Prior to the Dutch degree system change a single program at the university comprised the same course load as the bachelor's and master's programs together which led to the doctorandus degree (or for legal studies to the "Meester in de rechten" and engineering to "Ingenieur"). In 2002, with the introduction of the Bachelor's master's doctorate system, the single (4- or 5-year) program at Dutch universities has been changed and split into a 3-year program leading to the bachelor's degree and a subsequent a 1- or 2-year program leading to the master's degree.

Those who had already started the doctorandus program could, upon completing it, opt for the doctorandus degree (before their name, abbreviated to 'drs.'), or simply use the master's degree (behind their name) in accordance with the new standard. Since these graduates do not have a separate bachelor's degree (which is in fact – in retrospect – incorporated into the program), the master's degree is their first academic degree.

In 2003/2004, the Dutch degree system was changed because of the Bologna process. Former degrees included:

- baccalaureus (bc. for bachelor, corresponding to a BASc or BAA degree, it may be formally rendered as "B", followed by the specialization field, instead of "bc.")
- doctorandus (prefix abbreviated to drs.; it corresponds to MA or MSc, but it may be formally rendered as M instead of drs.),
- ingenieur (ing.) for graduates of the four-year courses offered by Dutch higher vocational colleges (HBO, that is; hoger beroepsonderwijs) see: university of applied science. It is similar to a BASc, BEng, BBE, BAS or BICT (BIT., and it may be formally rendered as B followed by the specialization field, instead of ing.
- ir. for those having graduated from technical university after a minimum of five years, corresponding to a MSc, but it may be formally rendered as M, instead of ir.),
- meester in de rechten (mr.; it corresponds to LLM, but it may be formally rendered as M instead of mr.) and
- doctor (dr.; it corresponds to PhD, but it may formally be rendered as D instead of dr.) are still granted along with their international equivalents.

While the titles ing., bc., ir., mr., drs. and dr. are used before one's own name, the degrees B, M or D are mentioned after one's name. It is still allowed to use the traditional titles.

Whether a bachelor's degree is granted by a hogeschool or university is highly relevant since these parallel systems of higher education have traditionally served somewhat different purposes, with the vocational colleges mainly concentrating on skills and practical training. A BA or BSc from a university grants "immediate" entry into a master's program. Moreover, this is usually considered a formality to allow students to switch to foreign universities master's programs. Meanwhile, those having completed a HBO from a vocational college, which represented the highest possible level of vocational education available, can only continue to a "master's" on completion of a challenging year of additional study, which in itself can serve as a type of selection process, with the prospective MSc students being required to cover a great deal of ground in a single year.

Recently, HBO (vocational) master's degrees have been introduced in the Netherlands. Graduates thereof may use neither the extension "of Arts" (MA) nor "of Science" (MSc). They may use an M followed by the field of specialization (e.g., MDes).

This year of study to "convert" from the vocational to academic (WO – wetenschappelijk onderwijs, literally "scientific education") is also known as a "bridge" or "premasters" year. Despite the use of the terminology "university of applied science" the higher vocational colleges are not considered to be "universities" within the Netherlands.

Important aspects of Dutch bachelor's degree courses (and others) relative to some of those offered abroad include:

- Duration. While in many countries courses are completed in a given time under normal circumstances, degree courses offered at some (though by no means all) Dutch institutions, including the most prestigious, can only be completed in three years by the best performing students.
- Academic year. The Dutch academic year has a formal duration of 42 weeks. In practice students are often expected and required to spend a great deal of the "free" time revising for examinations. This is not always true elsewhere, as in many countries a very long summer break is taken or examinations are before the winter break rather than after.
- Learning curve. Some education systems, notably the British one, involve a gentle introduction during the first year. This is generally not the case in the Netherlands, with the difficulty level in the first year serving as a type of "self-selection" with less committed and less able students routinely finding it difficult to keep up.

In February 2011, the Dutch State Secretary of Education decided to adhere to the recommendations written in a report by the Veerman Commission. In the near future, the distinction between academic and higher vocational degrees will disappear.

==== Spain ====
In Spain, due to the ongoing transition to a model compliant with the Bologna agreement, exact equivalents to the typical Anglosphere bachelor's degree and master's degree are being implemented progressively. Currently, there is an undergraduate bachelor's degree called "título de grado" or simply "grado" (its duration generally being four years), a postgraduate master's degree called "título de máster" or "máster" (between one and two years), and a doctor's degree called "título de doctor" or "doctorado". The "título de grado" is now the prerequisite to access a master's degree. The "título de máster" is now the prerequisite to access doctoral studies, and its duration and the kind of institutions that can teach these programs are regulated in the framework of the European Higher Education Area.

Spanish university qualifications are now defined by law (currently RD 1509 of 12 September 2008), included the 2008 reform was the replacement of the Catalog of titles by the Registry of Universities, Centers and Titles (RUCT)

Up until 2009/2010, the system was split into three categories of degrees. There were the so-called first-cycle degrees: "diplomado" or "ingeniero técnico", with nominal durations varying between three and four years; there were also second-cycle degrees: "licenciado" or "ingeniero" with nominal durations varying between four and six years; and finally the third-cycle degrees: "doctor". The official first-cycle degrees are comparable in terms of duration, scope, and educational outcomes to an Anglo-Saxon bachelor's degree. Meanwhile, the second-cycle degrees are comparable in terms of duration, scope, and educational outcomes to an Anglo-Saxon bachelor's + master's degrees combination if compared with the Anglo-Saxon system. In this traditional system the access to doctoral studies was granted only to the holders of "licenciado", "ingeniero" or "arquitecto" (second-cycle) degrees, and the "master" or "magister" titles were unregulated (so, there coexisted so-called "master" programs with different durations, from some months to two years, backed by universities or centers without any official recognition) and only the reputation of the program/institution could back them.

Specialisation now includes about 800 specific recognised study programmes and qualification titles although the former general qualification nomenclature has been retained so that grade/licencado is approximately BA or BSc while maestro generally indicates a practice licence similar to MA and doctorado a PhD published original research thesis.

Note: The Anglophone Bachelor's degree should not be confused with the official university entrance precursor, the Spanish Baccalaureate qualification available to Year Twelve students. That qualification is distinct from the International Baccalaureate Diploma Programme for young adults with similar aspirations.

==== United Kingdom ====
The bachelor's degree is the standard undergraduate degree in the United Kingdom, with the most common degrees being the Bachelor of Arts (BA) and Bachelor of Science (BSc). Most bachelor's degree courses (apart from the very rare postgraduate awards, and those in medicine, dentistry and veterinary science) lead to honours degrees, with ordinary degrees generally only being awarded to those who do not meet the required pass mark for an honours degree. With the exception of the postgraduate bachelor's degrees and bachelor's degrees in medicine, dentistry and veterinary science, UK bachelor's degrees (whether honours or non-honours) are first cycle (end of cycle) qualifications under the Bologna Process. Postgraduate bachelor's degrees and bachelor's degrees in medicine, dentistry and veterinary science are second cycle (end of cycle) qualifications. Some bachelor's degrees in medicine, dentistry and veterinary science offer intercalated degrees en route to the final qualification.

Bachelor's degrees should not be confused with baccalaureate qualifications, which derive their name from the same root. In the UK, baccalaureate qualifications, e.g. International Baccalaureate, Welsh Baccalaureate, English Baccalaureate, are gained at secondary schools rather than being degree-level qualifications.

Until the 19th century, a bachelor's degree represented the first degree in a particular faculty, with Arts representing undergraduate study, thus the Bachelor of Civil Law (BCL) at Oxford and the Bachelor of Laws (LLB) at Cambridge, for example, were postgraduate degrees. Vestiges of this system still remain in the ancient universities, with Oxford and Cambridge awarding BAs for undergraduate degrees in both arts and sciences (although both award undergraduate BTh degrees through associated theological colleges, and Oxford awards BFA degrees in addition to the BA) and defining other bachelor's degrees (e.g., BPhil, BCL) as postgraduate awards equivalent to master's degrees, although many postgraduate bachelor's degrees have now been replaced by equivalent master's degrees (e.g., LLM for the LLB at Cambridge and MSc for the BSc at Oxford). The same historical usage of indicating an undergraduate degree by it being in the faculty of arts rather than being a bachelor's degree gives rise to the Oxbridge MA and the Scottish MA).

Common bachelor's degrees and abbreviations:

- Bachelor of Arts: BA
- Bachelor of Science: BSc
- Bachelor of Laws: LLB
- Bachelor of Civil Law: BCL
- Bachelor of Engineering: BEng
- Bachelor of Education: BEd
- Bachelor of Medicine, Bachelor of Surgery: MBBS, MBBCh, BMBS, BMBCh
- Bachelor of Dental Surgery: BDS

===== England, Wales, and Northern Ireland =====
In England, Wales and Northern Ireland, bachelor's degrees usually take three years of study to complete, although courses may take four years where they include a year abroad or a placement year. Degrees may have titles related to their broad subject area or faculty, such as BA or BSc, or may be more subject specific (e.g. BEng or LLB). The majority of bachelor's degrees are now honours degrees, although this has not always been the case historically.

Although first degree courses are usually three years (360 credits), direct second year entry is sometimes possible for students transferring from other courses or those who have completed foundation degrees, via accreditation of prior learning or more formal credit transfer arrangements. Some universities compress the three-year course into two years by teaching for a full calendar year (180 credits) rather than a standard academic year (120 credits), thus maintaining the full 360-credit extent of the course.

In addition to bachelor's degrees, some institutions offer integrated master's degrees as first degrees in some subjects (particularly in STEM fields). These integrate teaching at bachelor's and master's level in a four-year (five-year if with industrial experience) course, which often shares the first two years with the equivalent bachelor's course.

The normal academic standard for bachelor's degrees in England, Wales and Northern Ireland is the honours degree. These are normally classified into one of four classes of honours, depending upon the marks gained in examinations and other assessments:

- First class honours (1st)
- Second class honours, divided into:
  - Upper division, or upper second (2:1)
  - Lower division, or lower second (2:2)
- Third class honours (3rd)

Some institutions have announced that they intend to replace this system of classifying honours degrees with an American-style Grade Point Average. An ordinary (or unclassified) degree, which only requires passes worth 300 credits rather than the 360 of the honours degree, may be awarded if a student has completed the full honours degree course but has not obtained sufficient passes to earn a degree. Completion of just the first two years of the course can lead to a Diploma of Higher Education and completion of only the first year to a Certificate of Higher Education.

On the Framework for Higher Education Qualifications, standard undergraduate bachelor's degrees with and without honours are at level 6, although the courses include learning across levels 4 to 6. Honours degrees normally require 360 credits with a minimum of 90 at level 6, while ordinary degrees need 300 credits with a minimum of 60 at level 6. Bachelor's degrees in medicine, dentistry and veterinary science are at level 7, with learning spanning levels 4 to 7, and are not normally credit rated. The Diploma of Higher Education is a level 5 (second year of bachelor's degree) qualification and requires 240 credits, a minimum of 90 at level 5; The Certificate of Higher Education is a level 4 (first year of bachelor's degree) qualification and requires 120 credits, a minimum of 90 at level 4.

Other qualifications at level 6 of the Framework for Higher Education Qualifications or the Regulated Qualifications Framework, such as graduate diplomas and certificates, some BTEC Advanced Professional awards, diplomas and certificates, and the graduateship of the City & Guilds of London Institute are at the same level as bachelor's degrees, although not necessarily representing the same credit volume.

===== Scotland =====
At Scottish universities, bachelor's degrees (and the equivalent Master of Arts awarded by some institutions) are normally honours degrees, taking four years of study (or five with a year abroad or in industry), but may also be ordinary degrees (also known as pass, general or designated degrees) requiring three years of study. Honours degrees may be awarded as BA (Hons) or MA (Hons) in the arts and social sciences, or BSc (Hons) for sciences, or have more specific titles such as BEng. As in the rest of the UK, integrated master's degrees, taking five years in Scotland, are also offered as first degrees alongside bachelor's degrees.

An honours degree may be directly linked to professional or vocational qualifications, particularly in fields such as engineering, surveying and architecture. These courses tend to have highly specified curricula, leaving students without many options for broader study. Others, following a more traditional route, start off with a broad range of studies across the faculty that has admitted the student or, via modular study, across the whole university. Students on these courses specialise later in their degree programmes. Typically degree grades are based only on the final two years of study, after a specialisation has been chosen, so broader study courses taken in the first two years do not affect the final degree grade.

Honours degrees are subdivided into classes in the same way as the rest of the UK, depending on the overall grade achieved. These are, from highest to lowest; first class, upper second class (2:1), lower second class (2:2), and third class.

Ordinary degrees are awarded to students who have completed three years at university studying a variety of related subjects. These may be taken over a broad range of subjects or (as with honours degrees) with a specialisation in a particular subject (in the latter case, they are sometimes known as designated degrees). As ordinary degrees in Scotland constitute a distinct course of study, rather than a grade below honours degrees, they can be graded (from lowest to highest) as "pass", "merit" or "distinction". As in the rest of the UK, Certificates and Diplomas of Higher Education may be earned by those completing one and two years of a bachelor's degree course respectively.

The first two years, sometimes three, of both an ordinary degree and an honours degree are identical, but candidates for the ordinary degree study in less depth in their final year and often over a wider variety of subjects, and do not usually complete a dissertation. A Scottish ordinary degree is thus different from ordinary degrees in the rest of the UK in comprising a distinct course of study from the honours degree. In keeping with the Scottish "broad education" philosophy, ordinary degrees (and more rarely honours ones) may mix different disciplines such as sciences and humanities taught in different faculties and in some cases even different universities.

Bachelor's degrees with honours are at level 10 of the Scottish Credit and Qualifications Framework (SCQF) and require 480 credits with a minimum of 90 at level 10 and 90 at level 9. Ordinary degrees are at level 9 and require 360 credits with a minimum of 90 at level 9. Both honours degrees and ordinary degrees qualify as first cycle (end of cycle) qualifications in the Bologna Process. Bachelor's degrees in medicine, dentistry and veterinary science are at level 11 of the SCQF and are second cycle (end of cycle) qualifications in the Bologna Process.

=== Oceania ===
==== Australia ====
In Australia, a "bachelor degree" is normally a three to four-year program, leading to a qualification at level 7 of the Australian Qualifications Framework. Entry to a number of professions, such as law practice and teaching, require a bachelor's degree (a 'professional' degree). Other degrees, such as Bachelor of Arts do not necessarily elicit entry into a profession, though many organisations require a bachelor's degree for employment.

A one-year postgraduate bachelor honours degree can be achieved as a consecutive stand-alone course following a bachelor's degree in the same field, or as an additional year as part of a bachelor's degree program. The honours course is normally only open to those who do well in their bachelor's degree program and involves study at a more advanced level than that bachelor's degree. Both the bachelor and bachelor honours degrees are aligned with level 6 of the EQF, the same as British and Irish bachelor's degrees with and without honours, and other Bologna Process first cycle qualifications.

Some bachelor's degrees (e.g. engineering and environmental science) include an integrated honours degree as part of a four-year program. Honours is generally for students who want to take up a research track for postgraduate studies, and increasingly for those who want an extra edge in the job market. Marking scales for Honours differ; generally, First Class Honours (85–100%) denotes an excellent standard of achievement; Second Class Division 1 (75–84%) a high standard; Second Class Division 2 (65–74%) a good standard; Third Class (50–64%) satisfactory standard; a final mark below 50% is a fail of the course.

Bachelor honours degrees include a major Independent research component, allowing students to develop skills that will enable them to proceed to further study or to work in research roles in industry. First-class or second-class (upper division) honours are generally required for entry into doctoral programs (e.g. PhDs, etc.); an alternative route to doctoral study is via a "masters degree".

==== Fiji ====
The colonial link and the establishment of the University of the South Pacific in 1968 allowed the education system to follow suit from the qualification system of the Commonwealth. University of the South Pacific is the only university in the Oceania region to be internationally recognized outside Australia and New Zealand with its bachelor's and other awards program. It is also the highest ranked in the university ranking in the island region and also ranked above some Australian universities like the University of Canberra, University of Sunshine Coast and New Zealand universities like Lincoln University and Waikato Institute of Technology.

==== New Zealand ====
In New Zealand, only recognised institutions – usually universities and polytechnics – have degree-awarding powers.

Most bachelor's degrees are three years full-time, but certain degrees, such as the Bachelor of Laws and the Bachelor of Engineering degrees, require four years of study. A bachelor with honours is a program of four years duration (e.g., Bachelor of Arts with Honours). A Bachelor of Medicine degree requires a minimum of six years.

Where students opt to study two bachelor's degrees simultaneously – referred to as a "conjoint degree" or "double degree" – an extra year of study is added. The number of years of study required is determined based on the degree with the greatest number of years. For example, a BCom degree requires three years of full-time study, but a double BCom–LLB degree will require five years of full-time study because the LLB degree is four years long. Exceptional students may choose to complete a degree in a shorter amount of time by taking on extra courses, usually with the help of summer school. Students who complete a double degree program will have two separate bachelor's degrees at the end of their studies.

Consistently high-performing students may also be invited to complete the 'honours' program. The bachelor with honours usually requires an extra year of study with an extra honours thesis/dissertation. This degree is considered to fall between the bachelor's and master's levels on the European Qualifications Framework. An honours award is indicated by the addition of "Hons" to the degree name or abbreviation (for example, "Bachelor of Laws (Hons)"). Some honours degree courses also offer a postgraduate diploma (PGDip) as an exit qualification, which often consists of the same workload but with added flexibility. A PGDip does not usually require a dissertation. However, the student may complete one if desired. A diploma award is indicated by "PGDip" and the degree field (for example, "PGDipArts" or "PGDipScience".

== Subjects ==
Many other specialized bachelor's degrees are offered as well. Some are in very specialized areas, like the five-year BIDes or BScIDes degree in industrial design. Others are offered only at a limited number of universities, such as the Walsh School of Foreign Service at Georgetown University's Bachelor of Science in Foreign Service (BSFS). The University of Delaware offers a Bachelor of Applied Arts and Science (BAASc) degree, a degree which often indicates an interdisciplinary course of study for many majors within its School of Arts and Science. Stanford University's Bachelor of Arts and Science degree is for students who are receiving one degree but who have completed two arts and sciences majors, one of which would ordinarily lead to the BA and one of which would ordinarily lead to the BSc.

At many institutions one can only complete a two-degree program if the bachelor's degrees to be earned are of different types (e.g., one could earn a BA in philosophy and a BScCEng in chemical engineering simultaneously, but a person studying philosophy and English would receive only a single BA with the two majors). Rules on this vary considerably, however.

=== Agriculture ===
The Bachelor of Agriculture (BAgr) offers a broad training in the sciences. The focus of this four-year applied degree is on the development of analytical, quantitative, computing and communication skills. Students learn how to apply the knowledge and principles of science to the understanding and management of the production, processing and marketing of agricultural products, and to the management and conservation of our natural resources.

This can include ecological agriculture.

=== Architecture and design ===
The Bachelor of Architecture (BArch) degree is a professional degree awarded to students who complete the five-year course of study in the field at some universities. Many universities offer a BSc or BA (majoring in architecture) after the first three or four years, and then a post-graduate diploma, BArch or MArch for the following two to four years.

The Bachelor of Design (BDes) is awarded to those who complete the four- or four-and-a-half-year course of study in design, usually majoring in a specific field of design, such as interior design or graphic design.

The Bachelor of Industrial Design (BID) is an undergraduate academic degree awarded by a university for a four-year course of study that specializes on the design of industrial products. Some colleges also offer four-year B.I.D. programs.

=== Arts ===
The Bachelor of Arts degrees (BA, AB; also known as Artium Baccalaureus) along with the Bachelor of Science degrees are the most common undergraduate degrees given. Originally, in the universities of Oxford, Cambridge and Dublin, all undergraduate degrees were in the faculty of arts, hence the name of the degree. The Bachelor of Applied Arts and Sciences (BAASc) is an undergraduate degree that bridges academic and work-life experiences.

=== Engineering ===
- The Bachelor of Engineering degree or Bachelor of Applied Science degree or Bachelor of Science in Engineering degree or Bachelor of Technology or AMIE(A&B) degree is a professional degree awarded to students who have completed the three or four-year course of study in engineering. Common abbreviations include BEng, BASc, BTech and BScEng. The BAI (baccalaureus in arte ingeniaria) degree is awarded by Trinity College Dublin. Some South African universities refer to their engineering degrees as BIng (Baccalaureus Ingeniaria).
- Bachelor of Engineering degrees available to study include: aerospace, automotive, chemical, civil, computer, electrical & electronic (E&E), industrial, mechatronic, and mechanical engineering.

=== Computer science and information systems ===
There are various undergraduate degrees in information technology incorporating programming, database design, software engineering, networks and information systems. These programs prepare graduates for further postgraduate research degrees or for employment in a variety of roles in the information technology industry. The program focus may be on the technical or theoretical aspects of the subject matter, depending on which course is taken.

- Theoretically oriented degrees focus on computer science and are correspondingly titled. These include the Bachelor of Computing (BComp) and Bachelor of Computer Science (BCompSc) degrees. Computer science is also offered as a major within most Bachelor of Science programs.
- The practically oriented degrees cover many disciplines from within the IT industry including software engineering, information systems, and data communications. Examples here include the Bachelor of Science in Information Technology (BScIT), the Bachelor of Computer Applications (BCA), the Bachelor of Information Technology, and the Bachelor of Applied Science (Information Technology) (BAScIT)) degrees. Many of the disciplines taught as part of these degrees are covered under other degrees, such as engineering, as well.
- Degrees combining IT with business study are also offered at many universities. Specialized programs in information systems—such as the Bachelor of Business Information Systems (BBIS) program—are often positioned as professionally oriented degrees. More general degrees here would include business degrees, such as the BBA or BCom, with information systems as a concentration.

=== Economics ===
A Bachelor of Economics (BEcon, BSc(Econ) and BEc) is awarded in British and Commonwealth institutions after following a rigorous programme of theoretical quantitative economic learning. Programmes usually include study of both microeconomics and macroeconomics, alongside empirical work in the form of econometrics. Economics can also be offered as a Bachelor of Science (with a more general focus on the quantitative methods) or a Bachelor of Arts (with a qualitative focus on the concepts). The Bachelor of Economics is substantially more theoretical and mathematical than the more commonly offered brethren.

=== Health care ===
==== Medicine ====
In countries following British tradition (the University of Malta is an exception), medical students pursue an undergraduate medical education and receive bachelor's degrees in medicine and surgery (MBBChir, MBBS, BMBS, BM, MBChB, etc.). This was historically taken at the universities of Oxford, Cambridge, and Dublin after the initial BA degree, and in Oxford, Cambridge, and Dublin the BA is still awarded for the initial three years of medical study, with the BMBCh, MBBChir, or MBBChBAO, respectively, being awarded for the subsequent clinical stage of training. Some British universities give a bachelor's degree in science, or medical science, midway through the medical course, and most allow students to intercalate a year of more specialized study for an intercalated Bachelor of Science (BSc), Bachelor of Medical Science (BMedSc), or Bachelor of Medical Biology (BMedBiol) degree with honours.

Although notionally MB and BS are two degrees, they must be taken together. In some Irish universities, a third degree, Bachelor of Arts in Obstetrics (BAO), is added. However, this third degree is an anachronism from the 19th century and is not registerable with the Irish Medical Council. In the UK, these qualifications, while retaining the title of bachelor's degrees, are master's degree level qualifications.

Use of the courtesy title of doctor is attached to the profession of doctor or physician and is granted by registration, not by earning the qualifying degree. Trainee doctors in the UK are allowed to use the title once they begin their training and receive provisional registration.

The Canadian MD degree is, despite its name, classified as a bachelor's degree.

==== Dentistry ====
Dentistry is offered both as an undergraduate and a postgraduate course. In countries following the British model, the first degree in dentistry is the Bachelor of Dental Surgery, which is a master's degree level qualification in the UK. In some parts of the world, the doctorate of dental surgery (DDS) is the usual undergraduate program. Postgraduate courses such as the Bachelor of Dentistry (BDent) – awarded exclusively by the University of Sydney in Australia – require a previous bachelor's degree.

==== Midwifery ====
The Bachelor of Midwifery degree is a professional degree awarded to students who have complete a three- to five-year (depending on the country) course of study in midwifery. Common abbreviations include BScMid, BM, BMid and BHScMid.

==== Physiotherapy ====
Physiotherapy is offered both as an undergraduate and a graduate course of study. Studies leading to the Bachelor of Physiotherapy (BPT) degree usually constitute the undergraduate program. In the graduate program, courses leading to a degree such as the Master of Physiotherapy degree are offered.

In the Canadian province of Quebec, French universities offer both undergraduate and graduate courses leading to the procurement of a Bachelor of Science degree with a major in physiotherapy and a Master of Science degree specialized in physiotherapy. McGill University, the Université de Montréal, and the Université de Sherbrooke are among the post-secondary institutions that offer such programs.

==== Optometry ====
Optometry is a four-year or five-year course. Although students graduate with a BSc after three years of study, passing a further supervised preregistration year is required to become a fully qualified optometrist. The National Institute of Ophthalmic Sciences is among the post-secondary institutions that offer such programs. It is the academic arm of The Tun Hussein Onn National Eye Hospital and the only eye hospital based institution in Malaysia.

==== Nursing ====
The Bachelor of Nursing degree is a three- to five-year undergraduate degree that prepares students for a career in nursing. Often the degree is required to gain "registered nurse", or equivalent, status—subject to completion of exams in the area of residence. Sometimes, though, the degree is offered only to nurses who are already registered. Alternative titles include Bachelor of Science in Nursing and Bachelor of Nursing Science, with abbreviations BScN, BN and BNSc.

==== Paramedicine ====
Paramedicine is offered both as an undergraduate and a postgraduate course in some countries. The Bachelor of Paramedicine (BScP, BP, BHScP) is a three- to a five-year undergraduate degree that prepares students for a career in paramedicine, paramedic services or emergency medical services. Countries such as Canada, United Kingdom, Ireland, Australia, New Zealand and South Africa have established paramedicine degree programs. The United States does not require a degree for paramedicine practice.

==== Veterinary science ====
The Bachelor of Veterinary Science program is generally a five-year course of study that is required for becoming a veterinarian. It is also known as the Bachelor of Veterinary Medicine and Surgery at some universities (BVMS). In the UK, this is a master's degree level qualification that retains the title of bachelor's for historical reasons. In the United States, no bachelor's degree of veterinary science is given, only the Doctor of Veterinary Medicine (DVM) degree is.

==== Pharmacy ====
The Bachelor of Pharmacy (BPharm) degree is a common undergraduate degree for the practice of pharmacy. In the United States, Canada, and France, however, all colleges of pharmacy have now phased out the degree in favor of the PharmD, or doctor of pharmacy, degree or the PhD, doctor of philosophy, degree in pharmacy. Some universities, such as the University of Mississippi, award a Bachelor of Science in Pharmaceutical Sciences (BScPSc) degree as a part of the seven-year PharmD program after the completion of the first four years. However, the BScPSc degree does not qualify the recipient for the practice of pharmacy, for which students must earn a PharmD degree.

==== Public health ====
Public health is usually studied at the master's degree level. Australia is one of the few countries where studies in Public Health are available at undergraduate level. Indeed, Australian undergraduate students may major in specific areas of Public Health such as Health Promotion/Education, Epidemiology, Healthcare Administration and Public Health Nutrition. The Bachelor of Science in Public Health (BScPH) degree is a four-year undergraduate degree that prepares students for careers in the public, private, or nonprofit sectors in areas such as public health, environmental health, health administration, epidemiology, or health policy and planning.

==== Medical and health sciences ====
- The Bachelor of Health Science (BHSc/BSHS) is a specialized degree awarded to students whose studies have focused on health care, health sciences, or health professions. Specific areas of study can include nursing, radiography, health care management, and health education among the other broad areas of health sciences. Some BHSc/BSHS programs are intended for prerequisite study to professional graduate programs, including physical therapy, physician assistant studies, and medicine. The degree is typically awarded following four to five years of collegiate study.
- The title BMedSc, BBioMedSc, BMedSc or BVMedSc is granted to students who have qualified in the field of biomedical science and medical science or veterinary medical science respectively. Universities that offer this course include the University of Western Ontario in Canada, University of Birmingham in the UK and the University of New South Wales, the University of Canberra, the University of Queensland, the University of Sydney, RMIT University, Flinders University, Griffith University, Monash University, Australian National University and the University of Melbourne in Australia.
- The degree of BMedSc can be awarded for students completing an intercalated degree whilst studying medicine as an intermediate award. The degree of BMedSc may also be awarded to an individual who, having followed the prescribed course of study for the degrees of MBChB, does not complete the undergraduate clinical training. In brief, this is normally awarded after the candidate has completed successfully the first three years of an undergraduate medical degree at certain UK (and Commonwealth) medical institutions.
- The Bachelor of Science in human biology degree is awarded by several universities around the world and focuses on biomedical research, health care, biotech business, pharmaceutical sciences, or a combination thereof.

==== Kinesiology ====
The Bachelor of Kinesiology degree (BK or BScK)is a specialized degree in the field of human movement and kinetics. Some schools still offer the subject under the aegis of a School of Physical Education as a Bachelor of Physical Education (BPE or BPhEd), although "kinesiology" or "human kinetics" is currently the more popularly accepted term for the discipline.

==== Nutrition and dietetics ====
Bachelor of Science in Nutrition and Dietetics (BSND), Bachelor of Food Science and Nutrition (BFSN) Specific areas of study include clinical nutrition, food technology, hospitality and services management, research, community worker, health care management, educator, sports science, agricultural sciences, private practice and other allied health fields. The degree is awarded following four to six years of collegiate study in America (average five years), from three to four in Europe and Australia. In America (especially Latin America), Nutrition per se is separated from Dietetics, where the latter is equivalent to a technical degree.

=== Aviation ===
The Bachelor of Aviation (BAv) is awarded to students who complete a four-year course of study in the field of aviation.

=== Divinity and theology ===
The Bachelor of Divinity, Bachelor of Theology, Bachelor of Religious Studies, Bachelor of Biblical Studies, and Bachelor of Religious Education (BD, BTh, BRS, BBS, and BRE) degrees are awarded on completion of a program of study of divinity or related disciplines, such as theology, religious studies, or religious education.

Traditionally, the BD was a graduate degree rather than a first degree and typically emphasised academic theology, biblical languages, etc. However, this has become a less common arrangement.

While the theological bachelor's degree is generally conferred upon completion of a four-year program, it is also conferred in some specialized three-year programs. From there, the next level of advancement is generally the Master of Divinity (MDiv), Master of Theology (ThM), Master of Religious Studies, or Master of Religious Education (MRE) degree. In the United States, the "mainline" Protestant clergy typically take a four-year bachelor's degree in whatever field they choose, then earn the MDiv (Master of Divinity) degree in an additional three years as part of preparation for ordination.

=== Fine arts ===
The Bachelor of Fine Arts (BFA) degree is a specialized degree awarded for courses of study in the fine arts, frequently by an arts school or conservatory, although it is equally available at a significant number of traditional colleges and universities. In contrast to the BA or BS, which are generally considered to be academic degrees, the BFA is usually referred to as a professional degree, whose recipients have generally received four years of study and training in their major field as compared to the two years of study in the major field usually found in most traditional non-Commonwealth Bachelor of Arts or Bachelor of Science programs.

In the United States, the Bachelor of Fine Arts degree differs from a Bachelor of Arts degree in that the majority of the program consists of a practical studio component, as contrasted with lecture and discussion classes. A typical BFA program in the United States consists of two-thirds study in the arts, with one-third in more general liberal arts studies. For a BA in art, the ratio might be reversed.

=== Film and television ===
The Bachelor of Film and Television (BFTV) degree is an undergraduate degree for the study of film and television production including areas of cinematography, directing, film production, script writing, sound, screenwriting, animation, and typography.

=== Integrated studies ===
The Bachelor of Integrated Studies (BIS) is an interdisciplinary bachelor's degree offered by several universities in the United States and Canada. It allows students to design a customized and specific course of study to best suit their educational and professional objectives. Generally, this degree is sponsored by two or more departments within the university. Schools which confer the BIS degree include the University of Manitoba, Pittsburg State University, University of South Carolina Upstate, Weber State University, Ferris State University, Arizona State University, University of Minnesota, Miami University (Ohio), the University of Virginia, the University of New Brunswick, George Mason University, and Tallinn University of Technology amongst others.

=== Journalism ===
The Bachelor of Journalism (BAJ or BScJ) degree is a professional degree awarded to students who have studied journalism at a four-year accredited university. Not all universities, however, grant this degree. In the United States, schools tend to offer the BA or BS with a major in journalism instead. The world's oldest school of journalism at the University of Missouri offers a BJ degree, not to be confused with the bachelor's degree in jurisprudence at Oxford University. In South Africa, Rhodes University has the oldest school of journalism in Africa and allows students to take a fourth-year specialisation to raise their BA to BAJ status, equivalent to a BA (Hons).

=== Landscape architecture ===
The Bachelor of Landscape Architecture (BLA) degree is awarded to students who complete the five- (in some countries four-) year course of study in the field.

=== Liberal arts ===
The Bachelor of Liberal Arts, Bachelor of General Studies, Bachelor of Liberal Studies, Bachelor of Science in general studies, or Bachelor of Applied Studies (BLA, BGS, BLS, BScGS, BAS) degree is sometimes awarded to students who major in the liberal arts, in general, or in interdisciplinary studies. The Bachelor of Professional Studies is awarded to students who major in professional career studies.

=== Library science ===
The Bachelor of Library Science or Bachelor of Library and Information Science (BLSc, BLISc) degree is sometimes awarded to students who major in library science, although Master of Library Science degrees are more common.

=== Music ===
The Bachelor of Music (BMus) degree is a professional or academic undergraduate degree in music at most conservatories in the US and the UK. It is also commonly awarded at schools of music in large private or public universities. Areas of study typically include music performance, music education, music therapy, music composition, academic fields (music history/musicology, music theory, ethnomusicology), and may include jazz, commercial music, recording technology, sacred music/music ministry, or music business. Small liberal arts colleges and universities without schools of music often award only BA in music, with different sets of requirements. (see also: BFA)

=== Nonprofit studies ===
A Bachelor of Nonprofit and Nongovernmental Organization Studies is a field that focuses on practices of the nonprofit sector. This area of inquiry examines the management and effectiveness of the nonprofit sector, and has sub-areas of research including administration, marketing, communication, economics, human resources, philanthropy, ethics, law, information technology, social entrepreneurship, grant writing, policy, fundraising, advocacy, volunteerism and civic engagement.

A variety of higher education institutions and research organizations are dedicated to the teaching and research of issues related to the nonprofit sector. Additionally, individual courses within related disciplines (e.g. Business, Sociology, Public Policy) examine nonprofit studies in a variety of contexts.

Nonprofit studies may also refer to studies of the voluntary sector, third sector, nongovernmental organizations, or civil society.

=== Mortuary science ===
The Bachelor of Mortuary Science (BMS) is a professional undergraduate degree, awarded by the Cincinnati College of Mortuary Science of Cincinnati, Ohio and Southern Illinois University Carbondale. It was introduced in 1986 and it is awarded to students that complete 120 semester hours of course work and receive passing scores on the National Board Exam administered by The International Conference of Funeral Service Examining Boards.

=== Philosophy ===
The Bachelor of Philosophy (BPhil. or PhB) degree is either an undergraduate or graduate degree (MPhil). Generally, it entails independent research or a thesis/capstone project.

=== Psychology ===
The Bachelor of Psychology degree (BPsych, or PsyB; also Bachelor of Arts or Science in Psychology, BAPsy, BScPsy) is a degree awarded to students who have completed a specialized course of study in the field of psychology – i.e. as opposed to a broad major in the subject within a general BA or BSc degree. Variants include the Bachelor of Arts in Applied Psychology, Bachelor of Arts in Clinical Psychology, Bachelor of Arts in Forensic Psychology, Bachelor of Arts in Organizational Psychology. Courses typically last four years, but may be as long as six. (See Psychologist § Licensing and regulation and Psychologist § Education and training.)

=== Education ===
The Bachelor of Education degree (BEd) is a four-year undergraduate professional degree offered by many American colleges and universities for those preparing to be licensed as teachers. Variants include the BEd, BAEd, BAT (Bachelor of Arts for Teaching), and BST degrees. Preparation for the MS in education, this degree is most often received by those interested in early childhood, elementary level, and special education, or by those planning to be school administrators. Secondary level teachers often major in their subject area instead (i.e., history, chemistry, or mathematics), with a minor in education. Some states require elementary teachers to choose a subject major as well, and minor in education.

In Canada, the bachelor of education is a two-year professional degree in which students will specialise in either elementary or secondary education, and that is taken after the completion of a three or four-year bachelor's degree with a major in a teachable subject, such as English, French, mathematics, biology, chemistry, or a social science. Some universities also offer concurrent, five-year programs with student completing both a bachelor's degree in arts or science as well as their BEd. The possession of a BEd and a second bachelor's degree is required to teach in most public anglophone and francophone schools in Canada. The BEd prepares teachers for completion of either MA (Master of Arts) programs in education, MEd (Master of Education) programs, or postgraduate certificates in education.

=== Science with education ===
The Bachelor of Science and/with Education degree (BScEd) is a degree awarded to students who complete the four- to five-year course of study in the field of science (major and minor in general biology, chemistry, physics, and mathematics) and education. Although notionally BSc and BEd are two degrees, they must be taken together. The graduates will work as science (physics, chemistry, biology) teachers in high schools, as lecturers in pre university colleges and matriculation centers and can progress to postgraduate programs (MSc and PhD) in various areas in science or education.

=== Forestry ===
The Bachelor of Science in forestry (BScF) is a degree awarded to students who complete a three-year course of study in the field of forestry.

=== Science ===
The Bachelor of Science degrees (BSc, ScB) along with the Bachelor of Arts degrees are the most common undergraduate degrees given. The Bachelor of Applied Arts and Sciences (BAASc) is an undergraduate degree that bridges academic and work-life experiences.

=== Science in law ===
The Bachelor of Science in Law degree (BScL) is a special-purpose degree that allows someone who has had some prior studies but has not achieved a bachelor's degree to resume his or her education and take up the study of law with the goal of eventually receiving the juris doctor degree.

=== Social work ===
The Bachelor of Social Work (BSW) degree is a four-year undergraduate degree. Usually the first two years consist of liberal arts courses and the last two years focus on social work classes in human development, policy/law, research, and practice. Programs accredited by the Council on Social Work Education require BSW students to complete a minimum of 400 field education or internship hours. Accredited BSW programs often allow students who are interested in obtaining a Master of Social Work degree to complete the degree in a shorter amount of time or waive courses.

In Latin America, this is a four to five-year degree that can replace liberal arts subjects into health sciences, resulting in social work as a type of community psychology and socioeconomic studies, focused in hospitals, prisons, or pedagogy, among others.

=== Technology ===
The Bachelor of Technology degree (BTech) is a three- or four-year undergraduate degree. Generally, the program is comparable to a Bachelor of Science degree program, which is additionally supplemented by either occupational placements (supervised practical or internships) or practice-based classroom courses.

=== Law ===
The Bachelor of Laws (LLB) is the principal academic degree in law in most common law countries other than the United States, and anglophone Canada, where it has been superseded by the juris doctor (JD) degree.

=== Talmudic law ===
The Bachelor of Talmudic Law degree (BTL) or a First Talmudic Degree (FTD) is the degree awarded in most Yeshivas around the United States.

=== Tourism studies ===
The Bachelor of Tourism Studies (BTS) degree is awarded to those who complete the four- or five-year course of study in tourism, laws regarding tourism, planning and development, marketing, economics, sociology, anthropology, arts and world history (dependent on the country in which one takes the course), ticketing, hospitality, computer applications, and much more. The course would have an interdisciplinary approach with a vast range of units so the tourismologist professional would be able to identify necessary actions toward a sustainable touristic environment focus on local community uniqueness, values and traditions. As tourism is a growing industry, in India there is a lot of opportunity for those who complete this course of study. It is available in select universities of India.

=== Mathematics ===
The Bachelor of Mathematics or Bachelor of Mathematical Sciences degree (BMath and BMathSc) is given at the conclusion of a four-year honours program or a three-year general program. Several universities, mostly in Canada and Australia, award such degrees. The usual degree for mathematics in all other countries is the BSc.

=== Urban and regional planning ===
The Bachelor of Urban and Regional Planning or Bachelor of Urban Planning or just Bachelor of Planning degree (BURP, BUP, or BPlan) is a degree offered at some institutions as a four or five-year professional undergraduate degree in urban planning. Programs vary in their focus on studio work and may or may not involve professional practice.

=== Innovation ===
The Bachelor of Innovation is a four-year degree in a range of different fields. The major fields, in engineering, business, arts, science or education, are similar to their associated BA or BSc degrees. The general education elements are restructured to provide a common core of innovation, entrepreneurship and team skills. The degree was created as a direct response to the increasing pace of innovation in today's society and the need for graduates that understanding effective teaming, as well as the innovation process.

== See also ==
- Associate degree
- Elective bachelor's degree
- Graduate school
- Honours degree
- Licensure
- Licentiate (degree)
- List of admission tests to colleges and universities
- Master's degree
- Validation of foreign studies and degrees
