= Pan-African University of the Congo =

Private university in Mont Ngafula, Kinshasa

Coordinates: 4°26′07″S 15°15′28″E

- Université Panafricaine du Congo
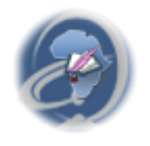
- Motto: Elitisme, innovation, épanouissement
- Type: Public university
- Established: 7 January 2010; 16 years ago
- Affiliations: Ministry of Primary, Secondary and Technical Education
- Students: Over 500
- Address: Mont Ngafula, Kinshasa, Democratic Republic of the Congo
- Campus: Urban, in Mont Ngafula and Selembao
- Language: French
- Website: upac-rdc.com

The Pan-African University of the Congo (French: Université Panafricaine du Congo), colloquially referred to by its acronym UPAC, is a public higher education and research institution located in Mont Ngafula, Kinshasa. Established under Ministerial Decree No. 004/MINESU/CABMIN/MML/DESP/KOB/2010 on 7 January 2010, the university officially began operations on 12 November 2011. As the first institution in the country to implement the Bachelor-Master-Doctorate (LMD) system, UPAC serves as a multidisciplinary center for training, research, and economic and social development projects. It also provides consultancy services and an analysis center to support national and international initiatives.

== History ==
UPAC was officially established on 7 January 2010, by Ministerial Decree No. 004/MINESU/CABMIN/MNL/DESP/KOB/2010. Spanning an area of 1,800 square meters, the university commenced its academic activities on 12 November 2011, with three foundational faculties: Law, Economics and Management, and Science and Technology, as well as a specialized program in Architecture. UPAC became the first university in the Democratic Republic of the Congo to adopt the Bachelor-Master-Doctorate (LMD) system.

The inaugural academic year, 2011–2012, was officially declared open by the university's first rector, Professor Willy Moke-Sangol Bongo Pasi, during a conference held on the opening day. The university, in line with Minister Léonard Mashako Mamba's vision for modernizing Congolese universities, began with 200 students per class.

On 16 September 2014, UPAC initiated the construction of a second second campus at 12th Street No. 45 in the Cité-Verte neighborhood of Selembao. At this juncture, academic programs were restructured into two primary faculties: the Faculty of Science and Technology, which encompasses Civil Engineering, Architecture, and Computer Engineering, and the Faculty of Human Sciences, comprising departments of Law and Economics. In 2015, it introduced the Faculty of Health Sciences and the Faculty of Information and Communication Sciences.

== Organization and trainings ==
=== Governance ===
UPAC's governance consists of three central components. The board of directors establishes the university's policies, sanctions the budget, and oversees key decisions. The management committee is responsible for managing daily operations, academic policies, and the quality of university life. The scientific council guides the research focus, supervises publications, and promotes and disseminates research outcomes.

=== Trainings ===
The training structure in the LMD system is divided into cycles, beginning with the first cycle, which awards the bachelor's degree. This degree prioritizes interdisciplinary studies and progressive development, consisting of three phases. The first phase, lasting the first two semesters, includes introductory and exploratory courses common to a group of subjects, assisting students in adjusting to university life. The second phase deepens basic knowledge in the chosen field and introduces specialization during the 3rd and 4th semesters. The final stage focuses on specialized courses and culminates in the preparation of an end-of-studies dissertation, internship report, or project, depending on the program's objectives. The bachelor's degree is granted to students who fulfill all academic requirements and accumulate 180 credits (30 per semester). At the end of the six semesters, most students (80%) join the workforce, while a minority may pursue further studies through specialization or research pathways, leading to a master's degree or doctorate. Mechanisms for monitoring and ensuring training quality must be identified and implemented at appropriate intervals.

The second cycle, leading to the master's degree, concentrates on specialization with objectives directed at professional or research-oriented outcomes. The master's program usually comprises two stages: a preparatory stage covering fundamental sector knowledge to define key skills and professional profiles, and a specialization phase in which students refine their expertise and engage in scientific research. The program requires the completion of 120 credits (30 per semester), with the final requirement being the submission and defense of a master's thesis before a committee.

Continuing education is also integral, with programs designed to respond to the ever-changing needs of professionals and the job market. These programs are developed in collaboration with companies, unions, NGOs, and other stakeholders to address workforce needs and career advancement. The programs aim to provide career-focused training to meet job market demands and facilitate career reconversions. Training is categorized into short-term programs (seminars, colloquiums, and conferences lasting 3 days to 3 months), medium-term programs (refresher and advanced training lasting 1 to 6 months), and long-term programs (lasting 1 to 2 years).

== Faculties ==
- Faculty of Science and Technology
- Faculty of Human Sciences
- Faculty of Health Sciences
- Faculty of Information and Communication Sciences

== See also ==
- University of Lubumbashi
- University of Kisangani
- University of Kinshasa
- Education in the Democratic Republic of the Congo
