= Fordham School of Professional and Continuing Studies =

- Latin: Schola Studiorum Professionalium et Continuandorum Fordhamensis
- Motto: Sapientia et Doctrina (Wisdom and Learning)
- Type: Private, non-profit, Independent, Catholic, Jesuit
- Established: 1944
- Parent institution: Fordham University
- President: Tania Tetlow
- Dean: Anthony Davidson, Ph.D.
- Location: Bronx, Manhattan, and West Harrison, New York, USA; 40.8626°N 73.8858°W
- Campus: Rose Hill (Bronx): Urban, 85 acres Lincoln Center (Manhattan): Urban, 8 acres (32,000 m^{2}) Westchester (West Harrison): Suburban, 35 acres (140,000 m^{2})
- Colors: Maroon and White
- Mascot: Ram
- Website: www.fordham.edu/pcs

Fordham School of Professional and Continuing Studies (formerly Fordham College of Liberal Studies) is a degree-granting undergraduate and graduate college within Fordham University in the United States. The college is specifically intended to serve non-traditional students, offering full-time and part-time study options, flexible schedules, and three different campus locations, in order to accommodate the needs of this population.

== Courses ==
The college offers Bachelor of Arts and Bachelor of Science degree programs. Fordham College of Liberal Studies follows the same core curriculum as the rest of the university's undergraduate colleges, and utilizes much of the same faculty. An honors program is available to very high academic achievers by invitation. It deviates from the core curriculum and relies heavily on faculty-supervised project work and independent research – an opportunity unavailable to non-traditional students at almost all other institutions. Completion of the honors program entitles a graduate to have the phrase in cursu honorum noted on the transcript and diploma.

== Credit assignment ==
College credit may be available to any student for prior instruction outside formal academic circumstances, such as military training or job-based technical training, and for life-experience learning. It is not possible to cobble together transfer credits, prior instruction credit, and life-experience credit alone to obtain a degree, however. A minimum number of college credits must be earned at Fordham College of Liberal Studies in order to receive a bachelor's degree.
