= Bachelor of Arts in Organizational Psychology =

Postgraduate university degree

A Bachelor in Organizational Psychology (also referred to as Industrial Psychology) is a type of postgraduate academic bachelor's degree awarded by universities in many countries. This degree is typically studied for in industrial and organizational psychology.

== Curriculum structure ==
A Bachelor of Arts or Science in Organizational Psychology is a four-year bachelor's degree, depending on the program, organizational psychology may be offered as a concentration to a traditional bachelor's degree in psychology.

Topics of study may include:

- Behavioral risk management
- Commitment
- Decision making
- Diversity
- Educational psychology
- Employment law
- Ethics
- Executive coaching
- Human factors
- Human resources
- Industrial sociology
- Job attitudes
- Job design
- job satisfaction
- Leadership
- Occupational health and safety
- Occupational health psychology
- Organizational citizenship behavior
- Organizational culture
- Organizational development
- Organizational research methods
- Organizational socialization
- Person-environment fit
- Personnel psychology
- Personnel recruitment and selection
- Performance appraisal
- Psychometrics
- Quality of working life
- Systems psychology
- Team composition
- Work motivation

== Institutions with organizational psychology degree programs ==
Institutions in the United States that have a Bachelor's in Organizational Psychology Degree Program include:

- Barry University
- DePaul University
- Florida Institute of Technology

== See also ==
- Applied psychology
- American Psychological Association
- List of tagged degrees
- Outline of psychology
- Society for Industrial and Organizational Psychology (SIOP)
