= Bachelor of Arts in Forensic Psychology =

Postgraduate university degree

A Bachelor of Forensic Psychology (also referred to as Industrial Psychology) is a type of postgraduate academic bachelor's degree awarded by universities in many countries. This degree is typically studied for in forensic psychology.

== Curriculum structure ==
A Bachelor of Arts or Science in Forensic Psychology is a four-year bachelor's degree, depending on the program, forensic psychology may be offered as a concentration to a traditional bachelor's degree in psychology.

Topics of study may include:

- Adversarial system
- Competency evaluation (law)
- Criminal law
- Criminal responsibility
- Element (criminal law)
- Forensic science
- Forensic psychiatry
- Hearsay evidence
- Justice system
- Mitigating factors
- Settled insanity
- Ultimate issue

== Institutions with forensic psychology degree programs ==
Institutions in the United States that have a Bachelor's in Forensic Psychology Degree Program include:

- Barry University
- Florida Institute of Technology
- St. John's University
- Arizona State University
- Southern New Hampshire University
- University of North Dakota
- Maryville University
- Walden University
- University of Denver
- Argosy University
- John Jay College of Criminal Justice

== See also ==
- Applied psychology
- Archuleta v. Hedrick
- Crime Classification Manual
- Dusky v. United States
- List of tagged degrees
- List of United States Supreme Court cases involving mental health
- Outline of psychology
- United States v. Binion
