= List of University of Guelph academic programs =

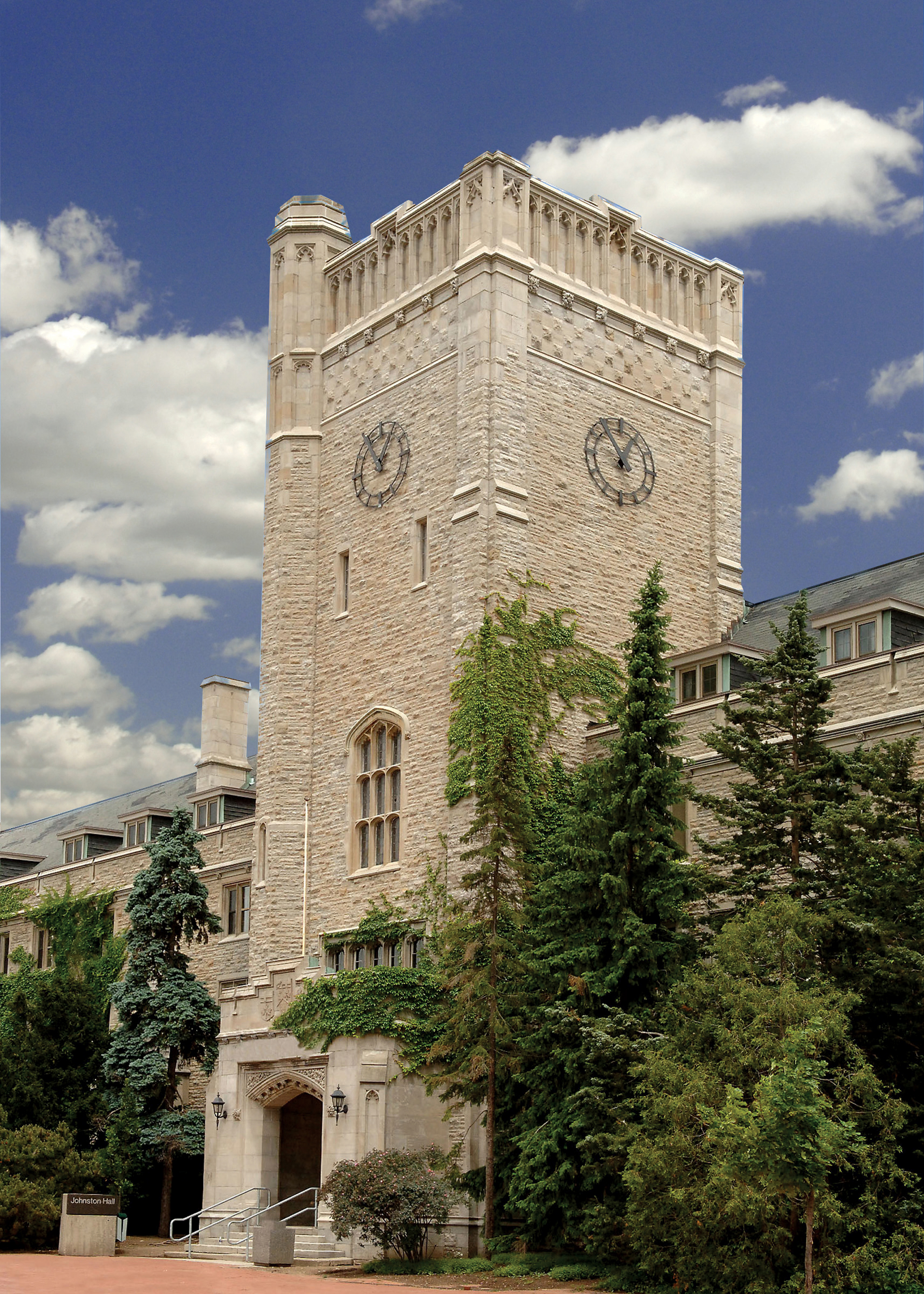
Originally established as a School of Agriculture, the University of Guelph was established in 1964 and now supports multiple programs over a wide array of disciplines.

There are over 94 undergraduate degrees, 48 graduate programs, and 6 associate diplomas in many different disciplines offered at the University of Guelph. The history of achievement in biomedical science, agriculture and veterinary medicine and the modern focus on life sciences are some of the strengths that define the university. The university is home to 23,000 full-time and part-time undergraduate students, 2,515 full-time and part-time graduate students and almost 3000 faculty and staff. Guelph students also have the lowest graduation rate among Canadian comprehensive universities (at 89%), 5.8% higher than the national average.

== Undergraduate programs ==
As of the 2022-2023 academic year.

=== Undergraduate Majors ===
Undergraduate Degree	Major	Coop	
Bachelor of Arts in Media Study (B.A.A.)	Media Studies	Yes	
Bachelor of Applied Science (B.A.Sc.)	Applied Human Nutrition	No	
Bachelor of Applied Science (B.A.Sc.)	Child Studies	No	
Bachelor of Applied Science (B.A.Sc.)	Family Studies and Human Development	No	
Bachelor of Arts (B.A.)	Anthropology	Yes	
Bachelor of Arts (B.A.)	Art History	No	
Bachelor of Arts (B.A.)	Classical Studies	No	
Bachelor of Arts (B.A.)	Creative Writing	No	
Bachelor of Arts (B.A.)	Criminal Justice and Public Policy	Yes	
Bachelor of Arts (B.A.)	Culture and Technology Studies	Yes	
Bachelor of Arts (B.A.)	Economics	Yes	
Bachelor of Arts (B.A.)	English	No	
Bachelor of Arts (B.A.)	Environmental Governance	Yes	
Bachelor of Arts (B.A.)	European Studies	No	
Bachelor of Arts (B.A.)	Food, Agriculture and Resource Economics	No	
Bachelor of Arts (B.A.)	French Studies	No	
Bachelor of Arts (B.A.)	Geography	Yes	
Bachelor of Arts (B.A.)	History	Yes	
Bachelor of Arts (B.A.)	International Development Studies	Yes	
Bachelor of Arts (B.A.)	Justice and Legal Studies	Yes	
Bachelor of Arts (B.A.)	Mathematical Economics	Yes	
Bachelor of Arts (B.A.)	Mathematical Science	No	
Bachelor of Arts (B.A.)	Music	No	
Bachelor of Arts (B.A.)	Philosophy	No	
Bachelor of Arts (B.A.)	Political Science	Yes	
Bachelor of Arts (B.A.)	Psychology	Yes	
Bachelor of Arts (B.A.)	Sexualities, Genders and Social Change	No	
Bachelor of Arts (B.A.)	Sociology	No	
Bachelor of Arts (B.A.)	Studio Art	No	
Bachelor of Arts (B.A.)	Theatre Studies	No	
Bachelor of Arts (B.A.)	Bachelor of Arts and Sciences (B.A.S)	Bachelor of Arts and Sciences	No
Bachelor of Bio-Resource Management (B.B.R.M.)	Environmental Management	Yes	
Bachelor of Bio-Resource Management (B.B.R.M.)	Equine Management	Yes	
Bachelor of Bio-Resource Management (B.B.R.M.)	Food Industry Management	Yes	
Bachelor of Commerce (B.Comm.)	Accounting	Yes	
Bachelor of Commerce (B.Comm.)	Food and Agricultural Business	Yes	
Bachelor of Commerce (B.Comm.)	Government, Economics and Management	Yes	
Bachelor of Commerce (B.Comm.)	Hospitality and Tourism Management	Yes	
Bachelor of Commerce (B.Comm.)	Management	Yes	
Bachelor of Commerce (B.Comm.)	Management Economics and Finance	Yes	
Bachelor of Commerce (B.Comm.)	Marketing Management	Yes	
Bachelor of Commerce (B.Comm.)	Real Estate	Yes	
Bachelor of Commerce (B.Comm.)	Sport and Event Management	Yes	
Bachelor of Computing (B.Comp.)	Computer Science	Yes	
Bachelor of Computing (B.Comp.)	Software Engineering	Yes	
Bachelor of Engineering (B.Eng.)	Biological Engineering	Yes	
Bachelor of Engineering (B.Eng.)	Biomedical Engineering	Yes	
Bachelor of Engineering (B.Eng.)	Computer Engineering	Yes	
Bachelor of Engineering (B.Eng.)	Engineering Systems and Computing	Yes	
Bachelor of Engineering (B.Eng.)	Environmental Engineering	Yes	
Bachelor of Engineering (B.Eng.)	Mechanical Engineering	Yes	
Bachelor of Engineering (B.Eng.)	Water Resource Engineering	Yes	
Bachelor of Indigenous Environmental Science and Practice (B.I.E.S.P)	Bachelor of Indigenous Environmental Science and Practice	Yes	
Bachelor of Landscape Architecture (B.L.A.)	Bachelor of Landscape Architecture	No	
Bachelor of One Health (B.O.H)	Bachelor of One Health	Yes	
Bachelor of Science (B.Sc.)	Animal Biology	No	
Bachelor of Science (B.Sc.)	Biochemistry	Yes	
Bachelor of Science (B.Sc.)	Biodiversity	No	
Bachelor of Science (B.Sc.)	Biological and Medical Physics	Yes	
Bachelor of Science (B.Sc.)	Biological and Pharmaceutical Chemistry	Yes	
Bachelor of Science (B.Sc.)	Biological Science	No	
Bachelor of Science (B.Sc.)	Bio-Medical Science	No	
Bachelor of Science (B.Sc.)	Biomedical Toxicology	Yes	
Bachelor of Science (B.Sc.)	Chemical Physics	Yes	
Bachelor of Science (B.Sc.)	Chemistry	Yes	
Bachelor of Science (B.Sc.)	Environmental Biology	No	
Bachelor of Science (B.Sc.)	Environmental Geomatics	Yes	
Bachelor of Science (B.Sc.)	Food Science	Yes	
Bachelor of Science (B.Sc.)	Human Kinetics	No	
Bachelor of Science (B.Sc.)	Marine and Freshwater Biology	Yes	
Bachelor of Science (B.Sc.)	Mathematical Science	No	
Bachelor of Science (B.Sc.)	Microbiology	Yes	
Bachelor of Science (B.Sc.)	Molecular Biology and Genetics	Yes	
Bachelor of Science (B.Sc.)	Nanoscience	Yes	
Bachelor of Science (B.Sc.)	Neuroscience	No	
Bachelor of Science (B.Sc.)	Nutritional and Nutraceutical Sciences	No	
Bachelor of Science (B.Sc.)	Physical Science	No	
Bachelor of Science (B.Sc.)	Physics	Yes	
Bachelor of Science (B.Sc.)	Plant Science	Yes	
Bachelor of Science (B.Sc.)	Theoretical Physics	No	
Bachelor of Science (B.Sc.)	Wildlife Biology and Conservation	Yes	
Bachelor of Science (B.Sc.)	Zoology	No	
Bachelor of Science in Agriculture (B.Sc.[Agr.])	Honours Agriculture	No	
Bachelor of Science in Agriculture (B.Sc.[Agr.])	Animal Science	No	
Bachelor of Science in Agriculture (B.Sc.[Agr.])	Crop Science	No	
Bachelor of Science in Agriculture (B.Sc.[Agr.])	Horticulture	No	
Bachelor of Science in Environmental Sciences (B.Sc.[Env.])	Ecology	Yes	
Bachelor of Science in Environmental Sciences (B.Sc.[Env.])	Environmental Sciences	Yes	
Bachelor of Science in Environmental Sciences (B.Sc.[Env.])	Environmental Economics and Policy	Yes	
Bachelor of Science in Environmental Sciences (B.Sc.[Env.])	Environmental and Resource Management	Yes	

== Graduate programs ==
=== Joint graduate programs ===
- Guelph-Waterloo Center for Graduate Work in Chemistry and Biochemistry (GWC2) is one of Canada’s largest and most successful graduate schools.
- Guelph-Waterloo Physics Institute (GWPI) is a joint graduate program offered by the Departments of Physics at the University of Waterloo and Guelph.
- Guelph-McMaster Collaborative MA Program in Public Policy and Administration
- The Guelph-Waterloo MA Program in Public Issues Anthropology
- Tri-University Graduate History Program (Waterloo, Laurier, Guelph)
