= Bachelor of Arts in Clinical Psychology =

Postgraduate academic bachelor's degree

A Bachelor in Clinical Psychology is a type of postgraduate academic bachelor's degree awarded by universities in many countries. This degree is typically studied for in clinical psychology.

== Curriculum structure ==
A Bachelor of Arts or Science in Clinical Psychology is a four-year bachelor's degree, or depending on the program, clinical psychology may be offered as a concentration to a traditional bachelor's degree in psychology.

Topics of study may include adversarial system, addiction, anxiety, behavioral therapy, clinical depression, cognitive behavioral therapy, eating disorders, family therapy, humanistic psychology, integrative psychotherapy, occupational therapy, phobia, psychosis, psychodynamic psychotherapy, psychological evaluation, psychological trauma, psychotherapy, relationship counseling, sexual dysfunction, sleep disorders, and training and licensing of clinical psychologists.

== See also ==
- Anti-psychiatry
- Applied psychology
- Clinical Associate (Psychology)
- Clinical trial
- List of clinical psychologists
- List of credentials in psychology
- List of psychology topics
- List of psychotherapies
- List of tagged degrees
- Outline of psychology
- Psychiatric and mental health nursing
- Psychoneuroimmunology
