= Université Notre Dame de Tanganyika =

Private Catholic university in Uvira, South Kivu

Coordinates: 3°21′35″S 29°08′54″E

Notre Dame University of Tanganyika
- Latin: Université Notre Dame de Tanganyika
- Type: Private
- Founder: Roman Catholic Diocese of Uvira
- Accreditation: Ministry of Higher and University Education
- Religious affiliation: Catholic Church
- Academic affiliations: Catholic University
- Chancellor: Mgr Sébastien-Joseph Muyengo Mulombe
- Rector: Juvénal Mukamba Lukumbusho
- Location: Kiyaya North Avenue, Kasenga, Mulongwe, Uvira, South Kivu, Democratic Republic of the Congo
- Website: https://www.undt.online/

The Université Notre Dame de Tanganyika (UNDT) is a private Catholic university located in the Kasenga quarter of the Mulongwe commune, Uvira, in South Kivu, Democratic Republic of the Congo. The institution was established by Ministerial Decree No. 001/MINESU/CAB.MIN/TLL/KGN/JMB/2020.

The university was founded to support national development efforts in the DRC. It primarily serves the pastoral zones of the Uvira Diocese—Uvira, Fizi, and Mwenga—while addressing the wider region's socio-economic issues. UNDT follows the LMD (Licence–Master–Doctorate) academic system and hosts a variety of faculties, including Law, Political and Administrative Sciences; Economics and Management; Agronomic Sciences; Computer Science; Psychology and Education; and General Medicine. Its research infrastructure includes on-site and digital resources, including the BOLB Library, over 20,000 digital documents, and more than 23,000 physical books.

== History ==
The Université Notre Dame de Tanganyika (UNDT) was created under Ministerial Order No. 001/MINESU/CAB.MIN/TLL/KGN/JMB/2020 to serve the Roman Catholic Diocese of Uvira. Its mission is to train ethical, skilled individuals committed to fighting poverty and driving progress in Africa, the DRC, and within the Diocese of Uvira, specifically in its three pastoral zones: Uvira Territory, Fizi Territory, and Mwenga Territory. UNDT's education model supports holistic development in scientific, spiritual, and moral aspects and prepares community leaders with the vision and capacity to create employment opportunities.

As part of its infrastructure development, in March 2023, a new facility comprising four auditoriums and administrative offices was officially inaugurated by the Bishop of Uvira, Mgr Sébastien-Joseph Muyengo Mulombe.

== Academics ==
=== Admissions ===
The UNDT maintains a structured and transparent admissions process for both first-year students and those seeking transfer or special entry. Admission into first-year (L1 LMD or Bac 1) programs—such as Law, Economics, Agronomic Sciences, General Medicine, Computer Science, and Psychology—requires candidates to submit an online application through the university's official website and meet specific eligibility criteria.

Applicants must have passed the national secondary school examination (EXETAT) with a minimum score of 60%. Those who score below this threshold are still eligible to apply but must successfully complete an entrance examination. Alongside the application, candidates must submit a complete file that includes a certified copy of the State Diploma (Diplôme d'État), a certificate of completion (attestation de réussite), or a printed exam result validated by an education inspector. They also must provide academic transcripts from the 4th, 5th, and 6th years of secondary school, a certificate of good conduct, a birth certificate, a certificate of physical fitness, a photocopy of their national ID, and four recent passport-sized color photographs.

For students seeking admission to upper-level classes or those transferring from other institutions, referred to as inscriptions spéciales, additional documentation is required. These candidates must include transcripts from their previous institution, a certificate of attendance or enrollment, and a formal letter requesting admission.

=== Offered programs and research ===
The UNDT offers the following academic fields and programs (faculties):

- Legal, Political, and Administrative Sciences
- Economic and Management Sciences
- Agronomic Sciences
- Computer Sciences
- Psychological and Educational Sciences
- General Medicine

The university's library system supports both on-site and remote scholarly activity. It comprises a virtual library with more than 20,000 digital titles and a physical collection housed in the BOLB Library, which contains over 5,400 volumes. UNDT expanded its collection with over 23,000 physical books obtained through the organization Livres sans frontières, alongside a specific collection meant for the Faculty of Medicine. Plans are underway to enhance digital resources by offering students online access to the collections of partner institutions such as the Catholic University of Congo (UCC), the University of Fribourg, the University of Milan, Université Catholique de Louvain (UCL), among others.
