= Joseph E. Murray =

American plastic surgeon (1919–2012)

- Born: Joseph Edward Murray; April 1, 1919; Milford, Massachusetts, U.S.
- Died: November 26, 2012 (aged 93); Boston, Massachusetts, U.S.
- Education: College of the Holy Cross (BA); Harvard University (MD)
- Known for: First successful organ transplant
- Awards: Nobel Prize in Physiology or Medicine (1990); Golden Plate Award (1991); Laetare Medal (2005)
- Scientific career
- Fields: Plastic surgery, reconstructive surgery, transplantation
- Workplaces: Harvard Medical School; Mass General Brigham

Joseph Edward Murray (April 1, 1919 – November 26, 2012) was an American plastic surgeon who was awarded the Nobel Prize in Physiology or Medicine in 1990 with E. Donnall Thomas for "their discoveries concerning organ and cell transplantation in the treatment of human disease."

Murray is known as the "father of transplantation" for major milestones in the field of transplantation, including performing the first successful human kidney transplant, defining brain death, organizing the first international conference on human kidney transplants, and founding the National Kidney Registry, the forerunner of the current United Network for Organ Sharing (UNOS).

== Early life and education ==
Joseph Edward Murray was born on April 1, 1919, in Milford, Massachusetts. He was the son of William A. Murray and Mary (née DePasquale) Murray. His father, William, was a lawyer and district court judge, while his mother was a schoolteacher. Murray was a third-generation Irish American on his father's side and a second-generation Italian American on his mother's side. He graduated from Milford High School in 1936. In high school, he was a prominent athlete and played football, ice hockey, and baseball. He decided at a young age to become a surgeon, in part influenced by his family's physician.

After high school, Murray enrolled at the College of the Holy Cross in Worcester, Massachusetts, graduating with a Bachelor of Arts, in cursu honoris, in 1940. As an undergraduate at Holy Cross, he concentrated his studies in Greek, Latin, English, and philosophy, despite having a strong interest in science. He then entered Harvard Medical School in September 1940. After the United States entered World War II, Murray and his classmates were drafted and their medical training was accelerated so that they could enter wartime service. During the final months of medical school, Murray met Virginia "Bobby" Link, then a music student, whom he later married in June 1945.

In 1943, Murray earned his Doctor of Medicine (M.D.) from Harvard Medical School and began a surgical internship at the Peter Bent Brigham Hospital. After approximately nine months of internship training, he entered the United States Army Medical Corps in 1944.

== Early career ==
Murray served in the plastic surgery unit from 1944 to 1947 at Valley Forge General Hospital in Pennsylvania. At Valley Forge General Hospital, he worked for Bradford Cannon, a prominent plastic surgeon, and developed a passion for plastic surgery. His unit cared for thousands of soldiers wounded on the battlefields of World War II, working to reconstruct their disfigured hands and faces. His interest in transplantation grew out of working with burn patients during his time in the Army. Murray and his colleagues observed that the burn victims rejected temporary skin grafts from unrelated donors much more slowly than had been expected, suggesting the potential for organ grafts, or transplants. In particular Murray was impressed with the case of Charles Woods, a 22-year-old pilot who had sustained burns over 70% of his body, including his face and hands, which required covering the burned areas with cadaveric skin grafts. The donor grafts survived long enough for Woods’ own healthy skin to be harvested and used as autografts to cover the burned areas. Over the course of 24 operations, the surgical team was able to remodel his eyelids, nose, mouth and hands, with Woods surviving the operations and eventually becoming a successful businessman. Murray would later recall, “The questions raised and lessons learned in trying to help Charles would determine the course of the rest of my professional life.”. Murray's first exposure to the field of reconstructive surgery ignited his lifelong passion for correcting terrible physical deformities and spawned another interest, transplantation – for Murray had seen for the first time how the tissue of one person could be used to save the life of another.

== Surgeon ==
After his military service, Murray completed his general surgical residency, and joined the surgical staff of the Peter Bent Brigham Hospital. He then went to New York to train in plastic surgery at New York and Memorial Hospitals, returning to the Brigham as a member of the surgical staff in 1951. Many of his peers discounted his pursuit, believing that the problem of immune rejection was insurmountable, as French surgeon Alexis Carrel (1873–1944), a 1912 Nobel Prize laureate, had concluded from his research that a “biological force” would forever prevent successful transplantation.

Murray was a practicing Catholic and faith played a role in his professional as well as his personal life. During preparations for the first transplant surgery, Murray and his team consulted clergy of all denominations while weighing the ethical issues of the procedure.

On December 23, 1954, Murray performed the world's first successful renal transplant between the identical Herrick twins at the Peter Bent Brigham Hospital (later Brigham and Women's Hospital), an operation that lasted five and a half hours. He was assisted by J. Hartwell Harrison and other noted physicians. In Operating Room 2 of the Peter Bent Brigham Hospital, Murray transplanted a healthy kidney donated by Ronald Herrick into his twin brother Richard, who was dying of chronic nephritis. Richard lived for eight more years following the operation, long enough to get married and have two children before succumbing to cardiac failure eight years later. His donor brother Ronald had no major complications and lived over 50 years after the surgery.

Throughout the following years, Murray became an international leader in the study of transplantation biology, the use of immunosuppressive agents, and studies on the mechanisms of rejection, as well as the study of how to ensure the health and well-being of living donors, and unequivocal opposition to monetary payment for human organs.

In 1959, Murray went on to perform the world's first successful allograft, who received a kidney from his non-identical brother, after being treated with total body irradiation and continued to live for another 28 years.

In 1960, Murray had to get the approval of the Massachusetts Superior Court before being able to transplant a kidney for a family who travelled from Red Deer, Alberta, Canada to see Murray from 12-year-old Lana Nightingale into her twin sister Johanna, who became the longest surviving kidney-transplant recipient with over 50 years, which is still the World Guinness Record for longest surviving kidney transplant patient.

Murray partnered with Nobel prize laureates Drs. George H. Hitchings and Gertrude B. Elion, both at Burroughs-Wellcome, who recognized the immunosuppressive capacities of 6–Mercaptopurin (6-MP) and synthesized the first immunosuppressive drugs. Together, they tailored the new drug Imuran (generic azathioprine) for use in transplants. The discovery of Imuran and other anti-rejection drugs, such as prednisone, allowed Murray to carry out transplants from unrelated donors. In 1962, Murray performed the first successful deceased donor (cadaveric) kidney transplant treated with Imuran, a derivate of 6-MP and steroids. By 1965, the survival rates after receiving a kidney transplant from an unrelated donor exceeded 65%, and today the success rate for a kidney transplant from a living donor is 90–95% after one year and the transplanted kidney lasts 15 to 20 years on average.

Murray worked on all the steps necessary to establish organ transplantation as the clinical treatment of choice for patients with irreversible organ failure. In 1962, Murray led the organization of the first international conference on human kidney transplants in 1962, followed by the founding of the National Kidney Registry, the forerunner of the current United Network for Organ Sharing (UNOS). In 1967, he participated in defining brain death, when Robert Ebert, the Dean of the Harvard Medical School convened a group of physicians, ethicists, and legal scholars to examine the characteristics of a permanently nonfunctioning brain, and Dr Murray was a member of that committee, which included famed neurosurgeon William Sweet, neurologist Raymond Adams, and legal scholar William J. Curran. The work of this committee led to consistent criteria that could be applied prospectively to declare death and ultimately to the Uniform Determination of Death Act (UDDA) in 1981.

As a Harvard Medical School faculty member, Murray trained physicians from around the world in transplantation and reconstructive surgery, frequently performing surgeries in developing countries. In his 20 years as director of the Surgical Research Laboratory at Harvard and as chief of transplant surgery from 1951 to 1971at the Peter Bent Brigham Hospital (which later became Brigham and Women's Hospital), he inspired others who became leaders in transplantation and biology throughout the world.

Notwithstanding his pioneering work in human transplantation, Murray's true passion was still reconstructive surgery. In choosing between the two, he decided to step down as chief of transplant surgery at Peter Bent Brigham Hospital in 1971 to focus on paediatric reconstructive surgery, becoming the chief of plastic surgery from 1972 to 1985 at the Boston Children's Hospital Medical Center in Boston, Massachusetts. He developed procedures for repairing birth defects and treating paediatric burn victims.

Murray retired as professor of Surgery Emeritus in 1986 from Harvard Medical School after recovering from a small stroke.

In 2001, Murray published his autobiography, Surgery Of The Soul: Reflections on a Curious Career, with stories about how surgery treats the souls of the patient and the surgeon, as well as the disease.

== Awards and recognitions ==
In 1990, he was honored with the Nobel Prize in Physiology or Medicine for his pioneering work in organ transplantation, together with hematologist E. Donnall Thomas.

Murray was elected as a member of the National Academy of Sciences and as a regent of the American College of Surgeons. He received the American Surgical Association's Medal for Distinguished Service to Surgery, the American Academy of Arts and Sciences' Francis Amory Prize, the American Association of Plastic Surgeons' Honorary Award and Clinician of the Year Award, and the National Kidney Foundation's Gift of Life Award.

He was named one of the 350 most outstanding citizens representing the medical profession for the City of Boston's 350th anniversary. In 1991, Murray received the Golden Plate Award of the American Academy of Achievement. In 1996, he was appointed Academician of the Pontifical Academy of Sciences in the Vatican. Murray was selected to receive the Laetare Medal by the University of Notre Dame in recognition of outstanding service to the Catholic Church and society in March 2005.

== Personal life and death ==
Joseph Murray married his college sweetheart, Virginia (Bobby) née Link, in June 1945, the two having first met at the Boston Symphony Orchestra. They would go on to have 6 children. Murray suffered a stroke at his suburban Boston home on Thanksgiving and died at age 93 on November 26, 2012, at Brigham and Women's Hospital, the same hospital where he performed the first organ transplant operation.
