= Bachelor of Applied Arts and Sciences =

The Bachelor of Applied Arts and Sciences, often abbreviated as BAAS or BAASc, is an undergraduate degree.

== Usage ==
In the United States, the Bachelor of Applied Arts and Sciences (B.A.A.S.) degree is considered a completion degree. The degree can be awarded to students who have both technical education and traditional college/university education. Some universities also give credit for work-related training and certification completed by the student. Applied Arts and Sciences degree programs typically require a student to complete an academic core program consisting of English, History, Political Science, Philosophy and Sociology and the Sciences like Mathematics, Biology, Chemistry and Physics consisting of 40-60 semester credit hours. Technical coursework can count 30-60 credit hours, and in some cases, work experience and certifications are evaluated and up to 30 credit hours may be awarded towards a degree. Upper level academic credit hours make up 30-45 hours of coursework, depending on the program. Some programs include the declaration of a particular major or specialization. Others include several concentrations. A total of 120 semester hours is the typical total credit requirement for most Bachelor's degree programs in the United States.

BAAS degrees are fully accredited degrees when offered by accredited educational institutions and meet the same qualifications as more traditional Bachelor's degrees, allowing admission into graduate schools and law schools for further study in pursuit of Master's degrees or Doctoral degrees.

== See also ==
- Bachelor of Applied Science
- Bachelor of Applied Arts
- Bachelor of Arts
- Bachelor of Science
- Bachelor's degree
