= Bachelor of Applied Science =

Undergraduate-level academic degree

A Bachelor of Applied Science (BAS or BASc) is an undergraduate academic degree of applied sciences.

== Usage ==
In Canada, the Netherlands and other places the Bachelor of Applied Science (BASc) is equivalent to the Bachelor of Engineering, and is classified as a professional degree. In Australia and New Zealand this degree is awarded in various fields of study and is considered a highly specialized professional degree. In the United States, it is also considered a highly specialized professional technical degree; the Bachelor of Applied Science (BAS) is an applied baccalaureate, typically containing advanced technical education in sciences combined with liberal arts education that traditional degrees do not have. Yet, an earned BAS degree includes the same amount of required coursework as traditional bachelor's degree programs.

Compared to the Bachelor of Arts (BA) and Bachelor of Science (BS), a BAS degree combines “theoretical and hands-on knowledge and skills that build on a variety of educational backgrounds”. BAS degrees often enhance occupational/technical education.

In February 2009, the Dutch Minister of Education, Culture and Science, Ronald Plasterk, proposed to replace all the existing degrees offered by Dutch vocational universities, such as the BBA, BEd and BEng, with the BAA and the BASc. Similarly, the United States has taken BAS as an official degree name.

== Fields of study ==
The BAS usually requires a student to take a majority of their courses in the applied sciences, specializing in a specific area such as the following:

- Agricultural systems
- Applied physics
- Applied mathematics
- Architectural engineering
- General engineering
- Automotive engineering
- Building Arts
- Biological engineering
- Biochemical engineering
- Built Environment
- Business informatics
- Chemical engineering
- Civil engineering
- Computer science
- Computer engineering
- Communication
- Construction Management
- Criminal justice
- Criminology
- Electrical engineering
- Environmental engineering
- Geomatics
- Occupational health and safety
- Public health
- Engineering management
- Engineering physics
- Engineering science
- Engineering science and mechanics
- Geological engineering
- Hospitality Management
- Industrial engineering
- Information management
- Integrated engineering
- Information systems
- Information technology
- Management engineering
- Management of technology
- Manufacturing engineering
- Manufacturing Management
- Materials science & engineering
- Mechanical engineering
- Mechanical engineering technology
- Mechatronics engineering
- Mining engineering
- Microbiology
- Nanotechnology engineering
- Nutrition and Food
- Paralegal Studies
- Forensics
- Astrophysics
- Professional Technical Teacher Education
- Project Management
- Property and Valuation
- Software engineering
- Sound engineering
- Surveying
- Sustainable building science technology
- Systems engineering
- Regional and Urban Planning
- Applied physics & electronic engineering
- Business management
- Social science
- Leadership

== See also ==
- Bachelor of Applied Arts
- Bachelor of Applied Arts and Sciences
- Bachelor of Arts
- Bachelor of Science
- Bachelor of Science in Information Technology
- Bachelor's degree
