= Bachelor of Applied Arts =

Undergraduate college degree

The Bachelor of Applied Arts, often abbreviated as BAA or B.A.A. is an undergraduate degree, with different meaning in different countries. The term 'Applied' means that the degree is vocational in nature, and not research-oriented (depending on the country of origin).

The term "applied arts" has been used since the late 19th century to differentiate it from the pure arts, fine arts, or regular humanities subjects, since it consisted of technical applications or a physical product or outcome. The term Bachelor of Applied Arts is used in a similar manner as Bachelor of Applied Science.

== Usage ==
The BAA is most often awarded in the Commonwealth of Nations, especially in Canada and New Zealand, but it is also awarded in the United States. For example, the BAA is awarded by Mount Saint Vincent University for child and youth study, also there are BAA awarded in architectural technology, interior design, applied linguistics, information technology, arts education, family studies, and gerontology. Northland Polytechnic in New Zealand offers the BAA for the visual arts. Texas Tech University is the only university to offer the BAA in the United States being the BAA in Commercial Music.

Canada

In the past in Canada a (BAA) Bachelor of Applied Arts was slotted into fields that were both technical and creative in nature, or did not fit any of the traditional curricula of a classic structure of a "humanities" style degree. In Canada the term originated with Ryerson University (now Toronto Metropolitan University) in Ontario and prior to the late 1990s most of the degrees were B.A.A., as opposed to a B.A. Ryerson changed to the traditional degree naming after the end of the 1990s.

At Ryerson programs were considered more professional in nature compared to other universities and offered theory classes along with practical applications, or at times combined in one class. There was also an outside program Liberal Studies - Humanities (breath) component for each program of study. Well known programs at Ryerson that used the B.A.A designation included Radio and Television Arts, Media, Journalism, Film and Photography, Theatre, Fashion Design and Merchandising, and Interior Design.

In the early 2000s some Community colleges in Ontario were granted the ability to grant degrees and the B.A.A was adopted as the degree designation. The B.A.A designation is now used for all Degrees at Community Colleges in Ontario, but the Liberal Arts or Humanities component of the degree is not as strong compared to programs at universities due to funding and the difference in Policies for Colleges and Universities.

Netherlands

On 20 February 2009 the Dutch Minister of Education, Culture and Science, Ronald Plasterk, proposed to replace all the existing degrees offered by Dutch vocational universities, such as the BBA, BEd and BEng, with the BAA and the BASc.

== See also ==
- Bachelor of Applied Science
- Bachelor of Applied Arts and Sciences
- Bachelor of Arts
- Bachelor of Science
- Bachelor's degree
