= Bachelor of Aviation =

Bachelor's degree within the aviation industry

The Bachelor of Aviation is a bachelor's degree for studies within the aviation industry. In the United States, it takes an average of four to six years to complete this degree. There are multiple areas of concentration that a student can specify when going to college.

In India, Bachelor of Aviation courses take an average of three years to complete, with the most highly sought course being a BBA Aviation course.

== Jobs ==
Students that study this degree pursue jobs in the aviation industry. This degree can train students in engineering, electronics, flying aircraft, managing air traffic, aircraft maintenance, aviation business, and more. Careers are available in all fields of the aviation industry, including pilots, air traffic control, airport and airline management, aircraft dispatching, aircraft maintenance, and more. Some of the more specific jobs in aviation include:

- Aerospace Engineer
- Air traffic controller
- Airport management and administration
- Airport operations
- Airport security
- Airline Management
- Aviation Safety Representative
- Flight dispatcher
- Airline Crew Support
- Airline Pilot
- Flight Instructor
- Aircraft Maintenance Technician

=== Eligibility For Bachelor Of Aviation Courses ===
Most universities only require that you gain admittance to the university. Aviation degrees deal in a wide variety of concentrations and each university has their own requirements. Depending on the university, enrollment in aviation courses is no different than any other academic course. Contact each university and their aviation department for their specific enrollment requirements.
