= Bachelor of Biblical Studies =

The Bachelor of Biblical Studies (BBS) is an undergraduate academic degree offering a comprehensive curriculum in the different aspects of the Bible including the Old Testament, New Testament and Gospels. Students of biblical studies will learn how to interpret the bible within a historical context and look at the philosophical aspects of religion and practical aspects of ministry. This degree is primarily offered by Christian educational institutions with strong adherence to a Christian worldview, though not exclusively.

The Bachelors in Biblical Studies may qualify graduates to become pastors, missionaries, evangelists, youth leaders, Christian counselors, worship coordinators, or in other aspects normally considered "professional" church ministry.

== See also ==
- Bachelor of Theology
- Bachelor of Religious Education
