= Elective bachelor's degree =

The elective bachelor's degree (Norwegian: selvvalgt bachelorgrad) is an educational innovation of the 2001 Quality Reform in Norway. Designed to increase degree completion, allow students to pursue individual research interests, and facilitate adult learning, the elective bachelor's degree is characterised by students not being enrolled in a study programme and their flexibility in composing and combining majors, minors, and elective courses differing from the fixed standard offered by study programmes. A fully-fledged bachelor's degree, the elective bachelor's degree makes the holder eligible for admission to graduate studies.

== Historical context ==
In the decades following World War II, the norm in Norway's labour market was that a person be hired by a company or enterprise and remain there for the duration of his or her work life. Later, more and briefer employments became a growing trend as Norway transitioned from industrial society to knowledge-based economy. Thus, in 1999 and 2001, Norway adopted two major reforms aimed at opening up higher education to more people than before and giving the sector a simpler and more uniform structure across the country, the latter also in order to allow higher mobility between academic institutions as well as internationally.

The Competence Reform (No. Kompetansereformen) was passed by the Parliament on 19 January 1999. The reform was a response to an emerging labour-market trend of more and briefer employments, including increasing unemployment among adult persons as traditional business sectors diminished. Not least, occupational reorientation of adult persons with sickness or declining health called for higher education to be opened up to broader population segments.

Two years later, the 2001 Quality Reform was passed as a logic continuation of the 1999 Competence Reform. In Norwegian Official Report 2000 No. 14 'Freedom with Responsibility: On Higher Education and Research in Norway', produced by the government-appointed Mjøs Committee, section 9.3 'Problems related to the degree structure' identified lengthy study programmes as a primary explanation for why many students did not complete their degree. The committee wrote:

A country's educational system and the structures for qualification affect the students' degree of completion and drop-out in education. It has become evident that countries with degree structures offering shorter study programmes leading to a [bachelor's degree] have lower drop-out rates than countries with long study programmes leading to the first degree. [Among OECD countries, the completion rates are 27 percent and 14 percent, respectively.]

The committee also discussed challenges related to interinstitutional mobility between universities, between universities and university colleges (a type of vocational or polytechnic demi-university), and not least to academic institutions abroad. A major obstacle for mobility between academic institutions in Norway was that not only universities and university colleges but also single universities had different degree systems. Addressing the challenges related to interinstitutional mobility, the committee wrote:

Today, this is a discussion which increasingly deals with mobility and transfer possibilities between public and private educational institutions, at different levels of education and between institutions internationally. [...] The degrees must be comparable and adaptable nationally as well as internationally. [...] The degree system must be flexible and offer good solutions for an increasingly varied student mass, be it, full-time students, adult- and continuing-education students, students with special needs, and students [who request] flexible learning.

Finally, in section 9.5.2, the committee wrote: 'Students who have taken single courses may, after directions specified by the Ministry [of Higher Education], have their accumulated education approved as equivalent to a degree.' This would in effect create the so-called elective bachelor: a fully-fledged bachelor's degree in which the selection of major, minor, and elective courses had been made by the student, contrasting elective bachelor's degrees to programme bachelor's degrees in which major, minor, and often also elective courses were preselected by the programme and compulsory for students.

The Quality Reform (No. Kvalitetsreformen) was passed by the Parliament on 12 June 2001, becoming effective in 2003. Along with a simplified degree system consisting of a three-year bachelor's degree, a two-year master's degree, and a three-year doctoral degree was introduced at all universities and university colleges, cf. the Bologna Process, one of its more important features was that more than before, universities and university colleges were obliged to recognise each other's credits while offering a nonprogramme bachelor's degree (elective bachelor's degree) for students' education accumulated from single courses.

== Legislation ==
The majority of universities in Norway are obliged by their respective royal regulations to offer elective bachelor's degrees, with exceptions being the University of Bergen, the Norwegian University of Science and Technology, and the Norwegian University of Life Sciences. The degree's official designation, content requirements, and so on vary between universities.

University	Official term	Regulation
University of Agder	selvvalgt bachelorgrad	Regulation of 22 June 2005 No. 833 on Studies and Exams at the University of Agder, sections 5 (2), 6 (1), letter e.
University of Oslo	fritt sammensatt bachelorgrad	Regulation of 20 December 2005 No. 1798 on Studies and Exams at the University of Oslo, sections 2-1 (2), 2-2 (3).
University of South-Eastern Norway	selvkomponert bachelorgrad	Regulation of 15 June 2018 No. 1090 on Studies and Exams at the University of South-Eastern Norway, sections 2-2 (1), letter d, (3), 9-1 (4).
University of Stavanger	selvvalgt bachelorgrad	Regulation of 6 December 2005 No. 1400 on the bachelor's degree at the University of Stavanger, sections 3, 4.
University of Tromsø	bachelorgrad i fritt sammensatte fag	Regulation of 12 December 2008 No. 1568 on Studies at the University of Tromsø – Norway's Arctic University, sections 6, 8, 11.
Nord University	selvvalgt bachelor	Regulation of 31 January 2019 No. 63 on Studies and Exams at Nord University, sections 2-3 (1), letter c, (2).
OsloMet	selvvalgt bachelorgrad	Regulation of 26 June 2012 No. 718 on Studies and Exams at OsloMet – The Metropolitan University, sections 2-3 (1), letter c, 2-4 (2).

== See also ==
- Academic degree
- Higher education in Norway

== Literature ==
- Bakken, Anbjørg 2003 (24 Mar). 'Tidligere studenter må tenke nytt!' Moss Dagblad, 35 (92): 14–15. https://urn.nb.no/URN:NBN:no-nb_digavis_mossdagblad_null_null_20030324_92_35_1
- Nordisk förening för pedagogisk forskning 2009. Nordisk pedagogik : Journal of Nordic educational research : Pohjoismainen pedagogiikka, 29 (4). København: Nordisk förening för pedagogisk forskning. https://urn.nb.no/URN:NBN:no-nb_digitidsskrift_2011120155030_001
- Witsø, Hilde & Hanne Stousland, eds. 2013. Likestilling 2013 : Kunnskap og innovasjon på Agder Kristiansand: Portal forlag. https://urn.nb.no/URN:NBN:no-nb_digibok_2013071008073
