= National Institute of Ophthalmic Sciences =

- Type: public
- Established: 1997
- Location: Selangor, Malaysia; 3°06′22″N 101°38′24″E
- Affiliations: Tun Hussein Onn National Eye Hospital
- Website: Official website

The National Institute of Ophthalmic Sciences is an educational institution affiliated with Tun Hussein Onn National Eye Hospital (THONEH) in Selangor, Malaysia.

== History ==
The institute was established in 1997 by Tun Hussein Onn National Eye Hospital (THONEH). It consists of the School of Ophthalmic Medical Personnel, the School of Optometry, and the School of Post Graduate Studies and Research. The courses are acceditated by Malaysian Qualifications Agency.
