= Bachelor of Science in Human Biology =

Undergraduate degree in human biology

Several universities have designed interdisciplinary courses with a focus on human biology at the undergraduate level. There is a wide variation in emphasis ranging from business, social studies, public policy, healthcare and pharmaceutical research.

== Americas ==
=== Human Biology major at Stanford University, Palo Alto (since 1970) ===
Stanford's Human Biology Program is an undergraduate major; it integrates the natural and social sciences in the study of human beings. It is interdisciplinary and policy-oriented and was founded in 1970 by a group of Stanford faculty (Professors Dornbusch, Ehrlich, Hamburg, Hastorf, Kennedy, Kretchmer, Lederberg, and Pittendrigh). It is a very popular major and alumni have gone to post-graduate education, medical school, law, business and government.

=== Human and Social Biology (Caribbean) ===
Human and Social Biology is a Level 4 & 5 subject in the secondary and post-secondary schools in the Caribbean and is optional for the Caribbean Secondary Education Certification (CSEC) which is equivalent to Ordinary Level (O-Level) under the British school system. The syllabus centers on structure and functioning (anatomy, physiology, biochemistry) of human body and the relevance to human health with Caribbean-specific experience. The syllabus is organized under five main sections: Living organisms and the environment, life processes, heredity and variation, disease and its impact on humans, the impact of human activities on the environment.

=== Human Biology Program at University of Toronto ===
The University of Toronto offers an undergraduate program in Human Biology that is jointly offered by the Faculty of Arts & Science and the Faculty of Medicine. The program offers several major and specialist options in: human biology, neuroscience, health & disease, global health, and fundamental genetics and its applications.

== Asia ==
=== BSc (Honours) Human Biology at All India Institute of Medical Sciences, New Delhi (1980–2002) ===
BSc (honours) Human Biology at AIIMS (New Delhi, India) was started in 1980 with a goal to bridge the gap between research performed at molecular/cellular level in vitro or in lower animal models and clinical research, creating a pool of scientists with a greater understanding of human physiology and tools to incorporate the big picture while still taking a reductionist approach to scientific research. As such, it provided a stepping stone for advanced career in research and allied fields. Candidates for the maximum of 25 open seats were selected via a nationwide entrance exam.

Origin

Prof. Prakash Chandra (b. 1952 - d.2006), who was Dean at AIIMS from 1979 to 1984, undertook the task of revising the undergraduate curriculum and initiated the BSc (Hons.) courses in Nursing and in Human Biology. Among the founders of Human Biology program was Dr. B. S. Narang, a well-renowned educator at that time, whose contributions are now recognized as Dr. B.S. Narang Memorial Prize awarded to the Best Undergraduate in Biochemistry at AIIMS.

Coursework

FIRST PHASE: During the first phase, students were exposed to the basic medical sciences: Human anatomy, physiology and biochemistry. This phase was run together with first year M.B.B.S. medical students who also followed the same curriculum.

- Human Anatomy: Gross cadaver (cadaver dissections, osteology and kinesiology), microanatomy of all systems of the body, neuroanatomy (of brain and spinal cord, its connections and function with demonstration of cut brain sections), embryology (development of human embryo normal and abnormal, study of various stages of microscopic and gross level) and genetics.
- Physiology: A complete review of the functional aspects of human physiology, neurophysiology, respiratory physiology, GIT, the special senses, skeletal and smooth muscles, cardiovascular system, excretory and reproductive systems.
- Biochemistry: An introduction to biochemistry and allied fields at the molecular, cellular and system level. Biomolecules, enzymology, metabolism and specialization in the tissues, immunology, biochemical genetics.

SECOND PHASE: The Phase II was designed to provide as broad an exposure scientific fundamentals and to various facets of research areas and basic concepts as possible. Each chosen subject matter was spread over three-to-five weeks and included lectures, tutorials (discussion sessions) and labs.

- Biomathematics: Differentiation and integration, partial differentiation equations, special functions, integral transforms.
- Biostatistics: measures of location and dispersion, sampling, probability, statistical distribution, tests of significance, correlation and regression, analysis of variance.
- Chemical basis of biology: Concept in organic and physical chemistry, nature of bonds, non-bonded interactions, quantum chemistry.
- Physical basis of biology: laws of inertia, gravitation, relativity, electrodynamics, quantum physics.
- Biochemical basis of biology: Organization of genes, viruses and plasmids, biochemical evolution, the organization of DNA, replication, the code, molecular basis of differentiation and morphogenesis, molecular basis of cancer.
- Biophysical basis of biology: Principles of structure and function of macromolecules, nucleic acids and proteins, small molecules, organization of macromolecular assemblies, lipids and membranes, phase diagrams, structure activity relationships in drugs, computer modeling.
- Principles of genetics and evolution: Heredity and variation, multifactorial inheritance, molecular genetics, chromosomal disorders.
- Pharmacology, Microbiology, and Pathology (concepts)
- Instrumentation and techniques in experimental biology: Principles of animal care, anesthetic agents, surgical skills, perfusion techniques, experimental design, bioassay techniques.
- Ecology and environmental biology: types of ecosystem adaptation to the environment, physiological changes in response to hypo/hyperthermia in humans.
- Reproductive biology and experimental endocrinology: the endocrinology of reproduction, human contraceptives, the animal models for studying hormonal control of reproduction.
- Bioenergetics and Biocybernetics: Basic thermodynamics, chemical kinetics, far from equilibrium thermodynamics, introduction to biocybernetics.
- Techniques in experimental biochemistry: Colorimetry, spectrophotometry, spectrofluorometry, pH determination, gel electrophoresis, chromatography.

THIRD PHASE: The third year was devoted to specialization in a chosen field of anatomy, biochemistry, biophysics, physiology or pharmacology. It involved in-depth instruction in the chosen fields, reviews of relevant research literature, seminars and term papers.

Since the first phase of the coursework was executed together with the incoming class of medical students, this program was unique in its similarity to the present day MD/PhD programs in US universities. The experience of this unique program format has inspired similar programs at Jayewerdenepura and Singapore.

History

The first class graduated in 1983. However, with the establishment of new Master's level programs, such as, MSc Biotechnology in 1986, and the shifting focus of the institute in late 80s and early 90s, the undergraduate "Human Biology" program lost its core support. The last batch of students was accepted for this course in 2002. Several components of the second phase are now incorporated into the MSc or M.Biotech curriculum at AIIMS.

=== BSc (Honours) Human Biology at University of Sri Jayewardenepura, Nugegoda, Sri Lanka (since 1994) ===
BSc Human Biology degree program was initiated in 1994 at the Faulty of Medical Sciences with the intention of fulfilling the need to provide human resources for Medical and Health sciences faculties; to those departments finding it difficult to recruit MBBS graduates with practical skills; specially intended for Pharmacy, Medical Laboratory Technology and Medical Laboratory Sciences courses. Also to provide research institutes, private sector institutions involved in food and nutrition, public and private sector diagnostic institutions and health policy making institutions with individuals with necessary knowledge and skills.

The Human Biology special degree course involves 3.5 (9½ terms) years of study in the Faculty of Medical Sciences and comprises three Parts. Similar to the program at AIIMS, Human Biology students follow the Part I & Part II of their degree course with the medical undergraduates. Part I and Part II comprise 12 units from Anatomy, Physiology, Biochemistry and four units from General Pathology, Parasitology, Microbiology and Pharmacology respectively. Part III of the course is the specialization year in a chosen field (Biochemistry, Food & Nutrition, Microbiology, Genetics, Pharmacology or Microbiology); the curriculum is designed so that the students are exposed to gain advanced knowledge in the selected specialization.

=== B.S. Human Biology at Kathmandu University, Nepal(since 2006) ===
Kathmandu University initiated Human Biology Course since 2006.

=== B.S. Life Sciences at National University of Singapore ===
- B.S. Life Sciences at National University of Singapore

== Australia and New Zealand ==
=== BBiomedSc (Bachelor of Biomedical Sciences) at University of Otago, Christchurch (since 2002) ===
A degree in Biomedical Sciences (BBiomedSc) at Otago is complementary to traditional discipline-based majors (e.g. Anatomy, Biochemistry, Genetics, Human Nutrition, Microbiology, Pharmacology, Physiology) currently offered within the Bachelor of Science (BSc) degree, but allows a wider diversity of health related papers to be taken. YouTube It provides qualification for graduate entry into medicine and other professional health science programmes, as well as increasing the range of career opportunities accessible to graduates. This degree aims at producing graduates with a sound and comprehensive grounding in the key principles underlying modern biological and medical research and their potential applications in biotechnology. Students completing the First Year Health Sciences course will have met the requirements to advance to 200-level in the Biomedical Sciences degree.

The degree structure is of a standard three-year bachelor's degree programme enabling students to graduate with a Bachelor of Biomedical Science degree. Biomedical Sciences is a combination of subject areas that promotes understanding of the scientific basis of health and disease in humans. Students have the opportunity of majoring in one of six subject areas offered: Drugs and Human Health, Functional Human Biology, Infection and Immunity, Molecular Basis of Health & Disease, Nutrition and Metabolism in Human Health, Reproduction, Genetics and Development.

A postgraduate Honours degree in Biomedical Sciences is also available to students who have completed the requirements for the BBiomedSc degree with an average grade of at least B+ for the appropriate 300-level papers.

=== Programs at Australian universities ===
- Bachelor of Science - Major: Human Biology University of Notre Dame
- Bachelor of Applied Science (Chinese Medicine)/Bachelor of Applied Science (Human Biology), Royal Melbourne Institute of Technology University (RMIT)
- Bachelor of Science (Human Biology), Edith Cowan University
- Bachelor of Science (Human Biology Preclinical), Curtin University of Technology
- Bachelor of Applied Science in Human Biology, University of Canberra,
- Bachelor of Science (Anatomy and Human Biology), University of Western Australia

== United Kingdom ==
British universities are at the forefront of providing a broad-based undergraduate curriculum in all major aspects of human biology; although courses differ widely in their emphasis. For example, Sheffield Hallam combines business studies to biosciences, healthcare and pharmaceutical sciences.

- BSc (Honours) Human Biology at Kingston University
- BSc (Honours) Human Biology at Queen Margaret University
- B.A./BSc (Honors) Human Biology and Psychology at University of Hertfordshire
- BSc (Honours) Anatomy and Human Biology at University of Liverpool
- BSc Human Biosciences at Roehampton University, London
- BSc Human Biosciences at Northumbria University, Newcastle
- BSc (Honours) Human Biology at Sheffield Hallam University
- BSc (Honours) Human Biosciences at Plymouth University
