= Bachelor of Agriculture =

Undergraduate academic degree

A Bachelor of Agriculture (BAgr) is an undergraduate academic degree awarded for a course or program in the field of agricultural science.

The degree typically encompasses a comprehensive study of various aspects of agriculture, including animal science, soil science, agricultural business, agronomy, and agricultural technology. The program aims to equip students with a broad understanding of agricultural principles and practices, as well as the application of scientific and technological advancements in agriculture. Graduates with this degree often pursue careers in farming, agricultural management, research, and agribusiness. The duration of the program varies by country and institution but generally spans three to four years at postsecondary level.

== Variations ==
=== Canada ===
In Canada, the bachelor's degree in agriculture differs from a Bachelor of Science degree in that the courses focus on agriculture: for example, the student will study agricultural economics rather than economics. Like engineering or forestry, agricultural science courses are infused with practicality.

The Ontario Agricultural College (founded 1873) began awarding a three-year Bachelor of Science in Agriculture degree through the University of Toronto in 1888: a fourth year to the program was added in 1902. Later, the Bachelor of Science in Agriculture program in Canada predominantly consists of four-year study in college.

=== China ===
In China, the Bachelor of Agriculture is an independent degree (Note: The Bachelor of Agriculture is a separate degree from the Bachelor of Science degree.) and one of the thirteen statutory types of bachelor's degrees. It is awarded to students who have completed an undergraduate program majoring plant production, nature conservation and environmental ecology, animal production, veterinary medicine, forestry, aquaculture and fishery, or grassland science.

=== United States ===
In the United States, the Morrill Act of 1862 (also known as the Land Grant Act) had a large influence on the rise of agricultural education and the spread of the bachelor's degree in agriculture. By the early part of the 20th century, all the agriculturally important states had at least one college or university awarding the bachelor's degree in agriculture.

=== India ===
The Bachelor of Science in Agriculture degree in India is typically a 4-year course under credit based semester system. The Indian Council of Agricultural Research is the key institute which drafts, renews the syllabus and also runs national institutes and research facilities across the nation. State governments are given rights to run Public Agriculture Universities, establish KVKs (Farmer's knowledge centres), Research Stations across the state. The curriculum is broad and interdisciplinary, consisting of courses in Agronomy, Basic mathematics, Crop Botany, Agricultural Biotechnology, Agricultural Microbiology, Crop physiology, Horticulture, Plant Pathology, Entomology, Agricultural Economics, Extension education, Genetics and Plant Breeding, Soil Science, Food technology, Nematology, Soil Microbiology, Agricultural Chemistry, Food Microbiology, Organic farming, Precision Agriculture, Animal Husbandry, Environmental Studies, Disaster management & Bio-informatics.

Like, the Bachelor of Science in Agriculture is considered as a 'professional' degree by Government of India, it has to be distinguished from other science degrees. Hence, it is advised to suffix "Honours" after the B.Sc. hence address as B.Sc. (Honours) Agriculture. However, in recognition to its 4-year duration, the degree holders are given some benefits like receiving higher stipend than BSc holders in DBT supported post graduate courses in Biotechnology. For the Gazetted post like Agricultural Officer (Agronomist), the basic educational requirement is B.Sc. in agriculture.

Graduates of B.Sc. Agriculture in India are eligible for a range of central and state government positions. Key recruiting bodies include the Indian Council of Agricultural Research (ICAR), NABARD, the Food Corporation of India (FCI), IBPS (for the Agriculture Field Officer post in public sector banks), and state Public Service Commissions for posts such as Agriculture Development Officer (ADO). Entry-level salaries for such posts range from approximately ₹35,400 to ₹1,50,000 per month depending on the organisation and examination cleared.

== See also ==
- Bachelor of Science
- List of agricultural universities and colleges
- List of tagged degrees
