= Job attitude =

A job attitude is a set of evaluations of one's job that constitute one's feelings toward, beliefs about, and attachment to one's job. Overall job attitude can be conceptualized in two ways. Either as affective job satisfaction that constitutes a general or global subjective feeling about a job, or as a composite of objective cognitive assessments of specific job facets, such as pay, conditions, opportunities and other aspects of a particular job. Employees evaluate their advancement opportunities by observing their job, their occupation, and their employer.

== Defining ==
Research demonstrates that interrelationships and complexities underlie what would seem to be the simply defined term job attitudes. The long history of research into job attitudes suggests there is no commonly agreed upon definition. There are both cognitive and affective aspects, which need not be in correspondence with each other. Job attitude should also not be confused with the broader term attitude, because attitude is defined as a psychological tendency that is expressed by evaluating a particular entity with some degree of favor or disfavor, whereas job attitude is a particular instance as an entity. In the definition above, the term "job" involves one's current position, one's work or one's occupation, and one's employer as its entity. However, one's attitude towards his/her work does not necessarily have to be equal with one's attitudes towards his/her employer, and these two factors often diverge.

== Types ==
=== Global ===
Global job attitudes are attitudes developed towards a job through the organization, working environment, affective disposition, aggregate measures of job characteristics and the social environment. They depend on the broad totality of work conditions. In fact, job attitudes are also closely associated with more global measures of life satisfaction. Scales such as "Faces" enable researchers to interpret overall satisfaction with work. The Job in General scale focuses on the cognitive perspective (rather than applied) of the effects of job attitudes. A variety of job attributes are associated with different levels of satisfaction within global job attitudes.

=== Other types ===
1. Job Involvement: Identifying with one's job and actively participating in it, and considering performance important to self-worth.
2. Organizational Commitment: Identifying with a particular organization and its goals, and wishing to maintain membership in the organization.
3. Perceived Organizational Support (POS): The degree to which employees feel the organization cares about their well-being. And also the organisation is paying him well salary if he leaves the company his family should be affected.
4. Employee Engagement: An individual's involvement with, satisfaction with, and enthusiasm for the organization.

== Affective ==
Affective job satisfaction is a singular construct comprising an overall emotional feeling about a job as a whole or in general. Affective job satisfaction is measured with items addressing the extent to which individuals subjectively and emotively like their job overall, not a composite of how individuals cognitively assess two or more specific aspects of their job. The 4-item Brief Index of Affective Job Satisfaction has been developed to produce a purely affective as opposed to cognitive measure of overall affective job satisfaction.

== Job facet satisfaction ==
Job facet satisfaction refers to feelings about specific job aspects, such as salary, benefits, and relationships with co-workers.

- Satisfaction with work: The emotional state of a worker while working is critical to job attitudes. Although a person may self-identify in terms of profession, for example as a doctor, lawyer or engineer, it is their well-being at work which is significant in characterizing job attitude. Satisfaction with work can be analyzed by evaluation (I like or dislike my job), cognitively (my work is challenging) and behaviorally (I am reliable).
- Supervision: Supervision has a significant relationship with productivity. However, supervision can only be taken positively with acceptance. Therefore, it is important to ensure a positive attitude to work.
- Co-workers: Co-workers are a common source of job stress, as demonstrated by studies using role theory.
- Pay and promotion: Given employee commitment and organizational personality orientation, compensation and advancement function as positive reinforcement, demonstrating that the worker is valued and reinforcing loyalty.

== Influencing factors ==
=== Emotional exhaustion ===
Interpersonal conflict affects job attitudes: cut-throat competition resulted in a bitter relationship with co-workers. The exacerbated stress leads to emotional exhaustion, and this negatively affects job attitude.

=== Personality ===
Subordinates' job attitude, such as job satisfaction and turnover intention, does not influence "satisfaction with the supervisor". The supervisor's personality strongly influences the subordinate's "satisfaction with the supervisor". Personality traits of the supervisor, in particular agreeableness, extroversion and emotional stability, are positively related to subordinate attitude and have a greater effect on subordinate satisfaction with supervision than do more general work-related attitudes. Supervisor agreeableness and emotional stability were positively related with employee satisfaction with the supervisor, and supervisor extroversion was negatively correlated with turnover intentions.

== Resulting behaviors ==
=== Cyber-loafing ===
Employees who have lower job involvement and intrinsic involvement are more likely to be involved in cyber loafing behavior. Employees who perceive the work environment as supportive and motivating are less likely to engage in cyber loafing; conversely, groups within the company who engage in social loafing using the internet create a norm of such behavior. However, there was only a limited relationship between non-internet loafing behavior and cyber loafing. Chit-chat between co-workers can be a sign of productivity as well as a sign of wasting time.

=== Task performance ===
Companies whose workers have positive attitudes are more effective than whose workers do not. Job attitude influences performance, and not performance that influences attitude.

=== Withdrawal vs. counterproductivity ===
Human relation variables and group norms are variables of job attitude that are directly related to turnover. Identification with the organization was directly related to turnover, whereas group norms had an indirect relationship with turnover.

== See also ==
- Bullshit job
- Decent work
- Labor rights
- Protestant work ethic
- Refusal of work
- Work ethic
