= Bachelor of Religious Education =

Undergraduate degree

The Bachelor of Religious Education (BRE) is an undergraduate degree.

It offers a broad education in the areas of scripture and Christian theology. This degree is primarily offered by institutions of a Christian worldview, though not exclusively so.

Typically, a BRE degree will be sought by those individuals who are interested in serving as pastors, teachers, missionaries, evangelists, youth leaders, worship coordinators, or in other forms of local church ministry. Alternatively, some BRE graduates go on to careers in the fields of business, counseling, education, law, media, and writing.

Several mainstream Christian churches will require students wishing to become ministers or priests to have a Bachelor of Theology, rather than a BRE.
