= Bachelor's master's doctorate system =

European system for higher education

The bachelor's master's doctorate system (in France réforme licence-master-doctorat or réforme LMD) is a European educational system designed by the Bologna Process. Its purpose is to standardize the educational system at European universities in order to harmonize study norms in terms of content, curriculum, syllabus, and course credits. As a result of this reform, European universities will offer the following three degree levels, but the names will vary from country to country: bachelor's, master's, and doctoral (PhD) degrees
