= List of tagged degrees =

Many universities offer programs of study which tag academic degrees with a particular speciality. A tagged degree incorporates the name of the subject of study into the degree title and generally requires more specialized coursework than a degree with an untagged major.

Tagged degrees come in two varieties:

1. the first form is a more general bachelor's or master's degree with a specialty tag appended to the title (e.g., Bachelor of Science in Nursing);
2. the second form is even more specialized (e.g., Master of Business Administration, Doctor of Medicine, etc.) and is generally associated with a professional education curriculum.

== Bachelor's degrees ==
- Bachelor of Accountancy (BAcc)
- Bachelor of Architecture (BArch)
- Bachelor of Agriculture (BAgr)
- Bachelor of Arts (BA)
- Bachelor of Business Administration (BBA)
- Bachelor of Commerce (BCom)
- Bachelor of Computer Science (BCS)
- Bachelor of Computer Application (BCA)
- Bachelor of Civil Law (BCL)
- Bachelor of Divinity (BDiv)
- Bachelor of Economics (BEc)
- Bachelor of Education (BEd)
- Bachelor of Engineering (BEng)
- Bachelor of Fine Arts (BFA)
- Bachelor of Laws (LLB)
- Bachelor of Letters (BLitt)
- Bachelor of Music (BM)
- Bachelor of Management Studies (BMS)
- Bachelor of Medical Sciences (BMed)
- Bachelor of Pharmacy (BPharm)
- Bachelor of Philosophy (BPhil)
- Bachelor of Physical Education (BPed)
- Bachelor of Science (BSc)
- Bachelor of Science in Nursing (BSn)
- Bachelor of Science in Public Health (BSph)
- Bachelor of Social Work (BSW)
- Bachelor of Technology (BTech)
- Bachelor of Theology (BTh)
- Bachelor of Medicine, Bachelor of Surgery (MBBS)

== Master's degrees ==
- Bachelor of Civil Law (BCL)
- Licentiate in Sacred Theology (STL)
- Magister Juris (MJur)
- Master of Business Administration (MBA)
- Master of Counselling (MCouns)
- Master of Divinity (MDiv)
- Master of Education (MEd)
- Master of Engineering (MEng)
- Master of Finance (MSF)
- Master of Fine Arts (MFA)
- Master of Laws (LLM)
- Master of Letters (MLitt)
- Master of Medicine (MMed)
- Master of Philosophy (MPhil)
- Master of Planning (MPlan)
- Master of Public Administration (MPA)
- Master of Public Health (MPH)
- Master of Research (MRes)
- Master of Sacred Theology (STM)
- Master of Science in Nursing (MSN)
- Master of science (MS)
- Master of Social Work (MSW)
- Master of Studies (MSt)
- Master of Surgery (ChM or MS)
- Master of Technology (Mtech)
- Professional Science Masters (PSM)

== Doctoral degrees ==
- Doctor of Arts (DA)
- Doctor of Audiology (AuD)
- Doctor of Business Administration (DBA)
- Doctor of Canon Law (JCD)
- Doctor of Civil Law (DCL)
- Doctor of Clinical Psychology (DClinPsy)
- Doctor of Chiropractic (DC)
- Doctor of Dental Surgery (DDS)
- Doctor of Divinity (DDiv)
- Doctor of Education (EdD)
- Doctor of Engineering (DEng)
- Doctor of Juridical Science (JSD)
- Doctor of Letters (DLitt)
- Doctor of Medicine (MD)
- Doctor of Ministry (DMin)
- Doctor of Naturopathic Medicine (ND)
- Doctor of Osteopathic Medicine (DO)
- Doctor of Pharmacy (DPharm)
- Doctor of Philosophy (PhD)
- Doctor of Psychology (PsyD)
- Doctor of Science (DSc or ScD)
- Doctor of Theology (ThD)
- Doctor of Veterinary Medicine (DVM)
- Juris Doctor (JD)
