= In cursu honorum =

In cursu honorum (lit. 'in a course of honors') is a Latin phrase that refers to specialized study at the undergraduate level. Generally, a small percentage of a student body will be invited to pursue a more rigorous course of study, and be required to maintain a high average. If completed, the phrase in cursu honorum will generally be noted on the college transcript and the diploma of that graduate.
