= PhD-MBA =

Double degree

A PhD-MBA or MBA-PhD is a dual degree program offered in some cases by schools of science, engineering or social science, jointly with business schools. The program generally lasts four to eight years and results in the candidate earning both a Doctor of Philosophy (PhD) degree and a Master of Business Administration (MBA) degree. Students may apply to the joint program before matriculating to either program, or after matriculating to the PhD programme. The programme often attracts entrepreneurs and venture capitalists.

Some of the leading PhD-MBA programs are offered by universities including:

- The Wake Forest University PhD/MBA program was established in 1999 and was the first of its type in the United States of America. The program is a joint degree between the Wake Forest University Graduate School of Arts and Sciences and the Wake Forest Schools of Business. Dr. Dwayne Godwin is the program director. The degrees are earned concurrently and the average time to awarding both degrees is 5.2 years.
- The University of Delaware's Department of Biological Sciences and the Alfred Lerner College of Business and Economics, jointly administer this program since 2006.
- Dartmouth, in USA since 2009
- Yale University, Yale Graduate School of Arts and Sciences with Yale School of Management
- University of Miami
- The alliance of two members of Sorbonne University and the Collège des Ingénieurs: UMPC for Sciences and Technology and Paris-Sorbonne for Humanities, in France since 2009
- or the similar alliance of Karlsruhe Institute of Technology and the Collège des Ingénieurs in Germany (since 2010)
- National University of Singapore (since 2011)
- Hebrew University
- Flinders University (since 2022, the first PhD/MBA in Australia and the Southern Hemisphere)

These programs are aimed at creating entrepreneurs and future technology leaders.

== See also ==
- Business education
- Doctor of Business Administration
- Doctor of Management
- Doctor of Commerce
- PhD in Management
- JD-MBA
