= Business education =

Teaching the skills and operations of the business industry

Business education is a branch of education that involves teaching the skills and operations of the business industry. This field of education occurs at multiple levels, including secondary and higher education.

== Secondary education ==
At secondary level, Business Studies, as it is often called, typically combines elements of accountancy, finance, marketing, organizational studies, human resource management and economics. The range of topics is designed to give the student a general overview of the various elements of running a business.

Business is taught as an academic subject at high school level in many countries, including: Australia, Bangladesh, Canada, Hong Kong, India, Ireland, Lesotho, Nepal, New Zealand, Pakistan, Nigeria, South Africa, Sri Lanka, Zimbabwe, Argentina, Sweden, Tanzania, Malaysia and the United Kingdom.

Many school systems (additionally) examine accounting and economics as separate subjects; these offering a more technical orientation than the course in general business.

Business mathematics may be included under business studies, or as a part of the mathematics syllabus.

== Undergraduate education ==
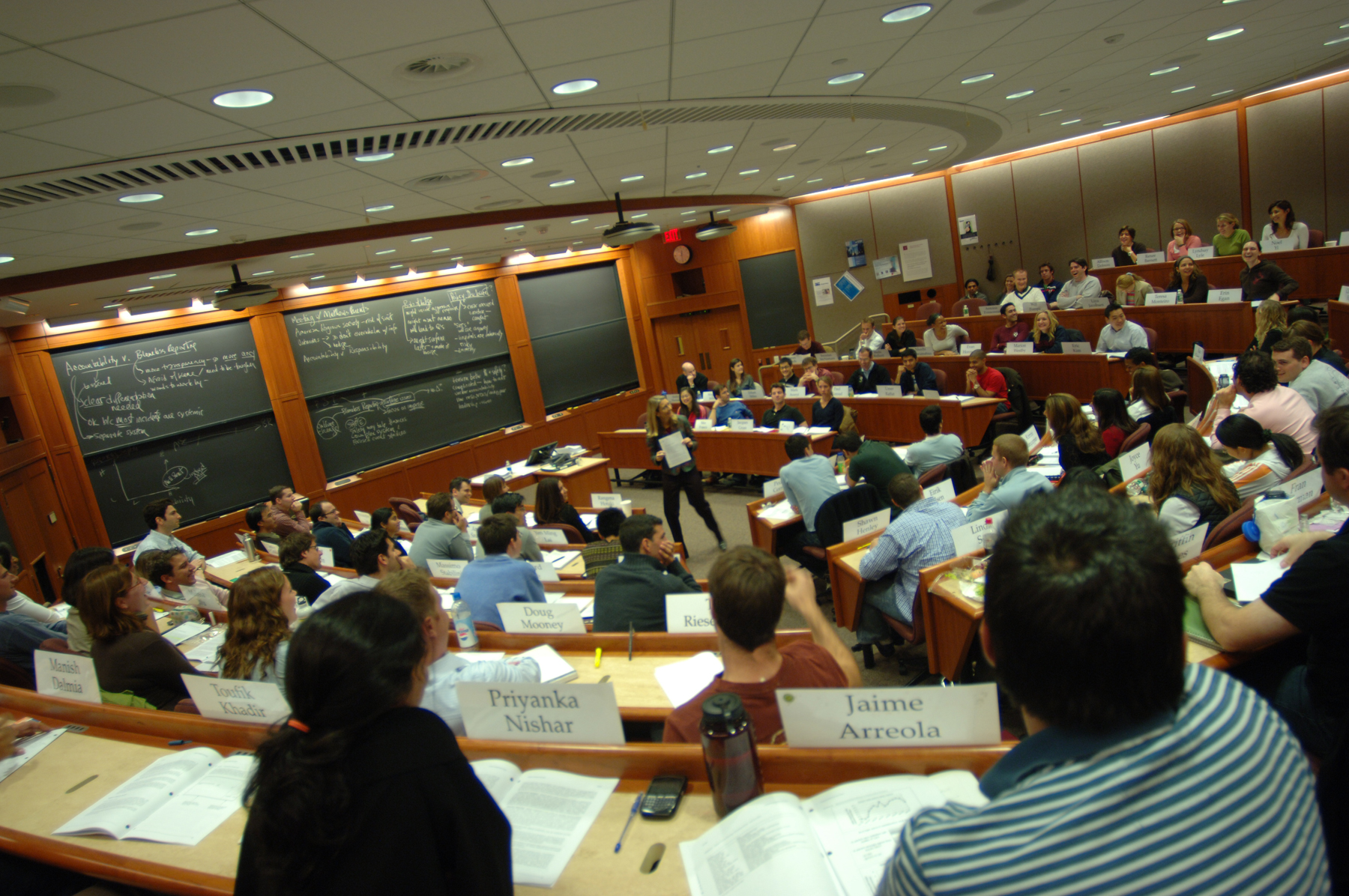
Students attending a class at Harvard Business School, the top-ranked business school in the world, according to U.S. News & World Report's 2023 rankings

Curriculum
- Management
  - Organization Structure
  - Productivity
  - Leadership
- Marketing, Sales and Public Relations
  - Marketing analytics
  - Brand Management
- Economics and Analytics
  - Market Trends
  - Supply and Demand
  - Elasticity
- Accounting
  - Managerial
  - Auditing
  - Tax
- Finance
  - Fixed Income Securities
  - Valuation Models
- Business Law
  - Regulations
  - Organizations
  - Legal Risk

At the university level, students have the opportunity to take undergraduate degrees, usually a bachelor's degree, in business and management. Specific curricula and degree-granting procedures differ by program and by region. In general though, the program will comprise either preparation for management and general business, or a detailed - more academic - focus on a specific area. Regardless, all will typically include basic selections such as Accounting, Marketing, Finance, Operations Management, and Economics for business. Examples of these concentrations, and some topics typically covered, are aside.

Management-directed programs are designed to give a broad knowledge of the functional areas of a company, and their interconnection, and also to develop the student's practical managerial skills, communication skills and business decision-making capability. These programs thus incorporate training and practical experience, in the form of case projects, presentations, internships, industrial visits, and interaction with experts from the industry.

Subject specific programs, on the other hand, focus on a particular area, and are often more weighted towards theory. Even in these cases, however, additional to their major, students are exposed to general business principles, taking initial courses in accounting/finance, human resources, statistics, marketing, economics, and information systems. Regarding, "tagged degrees" however, see below.

Degrees offered here include:

- The Bachelor of Business Administration (BBA) degree is awarded to students who complete three to four years of full-time study in business administration. The degree often, though not always, requires a major in a specific field such as accounting, finance, HRM/personnel, marketing, management, management information systems, real estate, strategic management, or others. Similar programs include the Bachelor of Science in Business Administration (BSBA), a quantitative variant on the BBA, Bachelor of Science in Business and Bachelor of Administrative Studies degrees. The Bachelor of Public Administration (BPA) is an undergraduate degree in public administration. The Bachelor of Business Management/Bachelor of Management Studies are similar to the BBA, but with a stronger emphasis on leadership and management skills.
- The Bachelor of Commerce (B.Com., or B.Comm; Bachelor of Commerce and Administration (BCA) is an alternate title) is, likewise, an undergraduate degree in general business management, although it is more theory-based and usually incorporates an academic major. The distinction between the B.Comm and the BBA, then, is often that the latter specifically applies theories to real-life business situations, while the former concentrates more broadly on a wide range of ideas and concepts in commerce and related subjects.
- The Bachelor of Business (B.Bus or B.Bus (Major)) degree is an undergraduate degree in general business management offered by universities in Australia, Ireland and New Zealand. Similar in nature to the Bachelor of Commerce degree, Bachelor of Business degrees are often awarded at technology-focused universities in accordance with the Dawkins review (1986) of the Australian higher education sector. At many Australian universities, a Bachelor of Business degree enables graduates to undertake greater specialty in their chosen academic major as compared to a general BBA degree.
- The Bachelor of Management and Organizational Studies degree (BMOS in Canada) is a four-year undergraduate degree in business management. However, this degree teaches knowledge-based business and is as much theoretical as it is case-based. The BMOS degree especially emphasizes social sciences such as psychology, sociology, economics, etc.
- The Bachelor of Business Science (B.Bus.Sc) degree is similar to the BCom. However, it is a four-year honors-level course with an increased focus on the major and covers management theory in further depth. Also, students taking this approach are able to major in various quantitative disciplines not (typically) available in the B.Comm or BBA; related to this—and similarly in distinction—all B.Bus.Sc students require a full first-year mathematics course, and in addition to this, courses in statistics.
- The Bachelor of Accountancy (B.Acy or B.Acc or B. Accty) degree is a specialized degree in accountancy; it is often the principal (or only) undergraduate degree recognized for later professional practice. It is distinct from a BBA or B.Comm with a major in accountancy in that the entire program is focused on accountancy, while other topics are supplementary. It is also known as Bachelor of Accounting, Bachelor of Accounting Science, or Bachelor of Comptrolling (B.Acc.Sci or B.Compt).
- The Bachelor of Economics (B.Ec, B.Econ, B.Econ.Sc) degree is similarly a specialized degree in the field of economics. Courses may last anywhere from three years to six years and are similarly more theoretical and mathematical than the general BBA or B.Comm with a major in economics (often substantially so). Economics is not a business discipline per se but a social science, and in the US economics degrees are therefore offered through liberal arts colleges. A specialized program is often available within other degrees, such as the BA (Econ), B.Sc (Econ), B.Soc.Sc (Econ), B.Com (Econ) or BBA (Econ).
- There are various other specialized business degrees, such as the widely offered Bachelor of Finance. More niched examples include the Bachelor of International Business Economics (BIBE), offered, e.g. at the Pompeu Fabra University, and the Bachelor of Arts in Organizational Management (BAOM) degree, a four-year program focused on management and leadership. Also offered are the Bachelor of Science in Business Education (BSBE), an undergraduate degree in the teaching of business and the Bachelor of Business Teacher Education (BBTE), a variant on the BSBE.
- Similar are the discipline-specific tagged degrees, such as the BS / BA in Finance, or in Marketing, or in Human Resources. Here, analogous to the B.Econ above, a high percentage of the coursework focuses on the specialization, with required courses in general business and other cognate topics; further, the distribution requirements may similarly be those of the general Arts or Sciences program, as opposed to business oriented.

== Postgraduate education ==
At the graduate school level, students seek a variety of master's degrees, either in general management — very commonly the MBA — or in a specific area, such as marketing or finance. A further distinction is that students pursuing postgraduate degrees often have some business experience, although this is not always a program requirement.

Corresponding to both of these, graduate degrees in business and management are generally of two types. On the one hand, programs such as the Master of Science (M.Sc.), Master of Arts (MA), or Master of Commerce (M.Com.) in General Management (sometimes also called Master in Management, or MIM) usually do not require professional experience. Often, the M.Sc. in Management is for graduates with a first academic degree in social science, while the MA in Management is for those from other backgrounds. The Master of Engineering Management (MEM) is aimed at graduates with an engineering background. On the other hand, the Master of Business Administration (MBA) requires a minimum of two to three years of professional experience and is open to graduates from any field.

A related distinction is that the M.Sc. in Management is more specialized than an MBA and is more suited for academic research, while the MBA is more industry- and management-focused.

As regards degree structure, postgraduate business programs are, in general, designed such that students gain exposure to theory and practice alike; the mix, though, will differ by degree and by school, as discussed. As regards degree structure, postgraduate business programs are, in general, designed such that students gain exposure to theory and practice alike; the mix, though, will differ by degree and by school. Many programs also incorporate work-based projects or authentic assessments that allow students to apply business concepts to professional settings; for example, the Australian Institute of Business includes a work-based project in the final subject of its MBA program. Learning is through lectures, case studies, and often team projects ("syndicate" work). The theory is covered in the classroom setting by academic faculty. Particularly in the MBA, the theory is then reinforced, and revisited, also in the classroom setting, through the case method, placing the student in the role of the decision maker, "complete with the constraints and incomplete information found in real business issues." Practical learning often comprises consulting projects with real clients, or at least addressing an actual case, and is often undertaken in teams. The practical elements (as well as the case studies) may involve external practitioners, and sometimes executives, supporting the teaching from academic faculty. (See Business school § Use of case studies and § Other approaches.) One of the challenges for business academics is demonstrating that their curriculum is relevant to those who want to become managers.

Degrees offered include:

- Master of Accountancy/Master of Professional Accountancy (M.Acc, M.Acy/MPA or M.P.Acc), a postgraduate degree in accounting
- Master of Bioscience Enterprise (M.Bio.Ent), focused on the commercialisation of biotechnology
- Master of Business Administration (MBA), a master's degree in Business Administration
- Master of Business Communication (MBC),
- Master of Business and Management (MBM), focused on generalist managerial and leadership skills; often intended for students beginning their careers
- Master of Business Education (MBE), focusing on teaching business teacher education
- Master of Business Engineering (MBE), focused on the design and management of enterprises
- Master of Business (M.Bus) and Master of Commerce (M.Com. or M.Comm), focused on a particular area of business or economics; often theory weighted
- Master of Computer Information Systems (MCIS), professional graduate degree focused on business technology solutions
- Master of Economics (M.Econ/M.Ec), theory oriented, but often available as a more practical "applied" degree, where students are trained re data-driven business analytics and decision support
- Master of Engineering Management (MEM), aimed at graduates with an engineering background
- Master of Enterprise (M.Ent), multi-disciplinary; entrepreneurship combined with a specific discipline
- Master of Science in Finance / Master of Applied Finance (M.Fin); training in financial management and corporate finance, as well as the more specific financial modelling and risk management
- Master of Health Administration (MHA)
- Master of International Business (MIB), focused on International Business
- Master of Management (MM), focused on leadership coupled with interrelated management issues
- Master of Management: Co-operatives and Credit Unions, a post-graduate degree for co-operative and credit union managers
- Master of Marketing Research (MMR) a postgraduate degree focusing on research in the field of marketing
- Master of Nonprofit Organizations (MNO or MNPO), the postgraduate degree for philanthropy and voluntary sector professionals
- Master of Project Management (MSPM or MPM)
- Master of Public Administration (MPA)
- Master of Real Estate (M.Sc.RE)
- Master of Science in Business Administration (MSBA), advanced training in a particular area of business administration
- Master of Science in Business Administration in Computer Information Systems (MSBA-CIS), advanced training in business technology
- Master of Science in Management (MSM), management focused, targeting recent graduates
- Professional Science Masters (PSM), interdisciplinary; advanced training in science or mathematics, with professional skills required for a commercial context.
- Green MBA, often offered as a "Master in Sustainable Business" (MSB)

== Doctoral ==
At the doctoral level, all degrees offered are research focused, although they do differ as regards their relative weightings of theory versus practice. Typically, the DBA, DPA, DHA and D.Mgt emphasize managerial practice alongside research; relatedly, the theses for these degrees will often focus on applied research. The other doctorates here are (exclusively) theory and research based. Entrance is usually on the basis of a relevant master's degree, and for practice-weighted degrees, relevant managerial experience. For the topic areas applicable to the thesis component, see List of fields of doctoral studies in the United States § Business management/administration. Degrees offered here include:

- Doctor of Business Administration (DBA)
- Doctor of Commerce (D.Com.)
- Doctor of Health Administration (D.H.A.)
- Doctor of Management (D.M., D.Mgt)
- Doctor of Public Administration (DPA)
- PhD in Management (Ph.D.)
- Ph.D/M.B.A (double degree)
- Fellow Program in Management (FPM)
- Engineering Doctorate (EngD), A professional doctorate involving a management thesis and taught MBA courses in the UK
- Doctor of Education (EdD), A professional doctorate with concentrations in business and education, including Management, Marketing, Accounting, International Business

== Internships ==
An internship is when a person works for a company for a temporary amount of time, typically for a few weeks over the summer or winter. By participating in the program, a student will be able to act in the everyday operation of the industry. They give the participants real-world experience in their desired career. Internships also give the company it is at an idea of whether or not the participant would be a good fit as a full-time employee. Many people complete internships while they are in school, whether that be secondary or post-secondary education. These are very common, and have started to be a requirement, in finding a job in the business world. Although internships are by no means a new form of educating a student, the amount that have completed a program has only continued to grow. In 2008 about one out of every two graduating college students had included a completed internship in their job applications.

There is significant evidence indicating that completing an internship develops skills essential to success in the business world as well as everyday life. The skills that are mainly developed while participating in an internship program includes interpersonal and social skills, as well as quantitative or other technical skills. Many internships use group projects as well in order to develop teamwork and leadership skills. All of these skills are vital to a business and are difficult to be taught in a class room. These skills are very valuable to a company and the ability to train these skills is making internships extremely valuable in business.

== Career development ==
Many programs within a business education have a main focus on the career development of their students or audience. They want to prepare them for entering the labor market and ensure they possess the best knowledge and skills of the industry possible. The aid in these programs can range from the guidance in career choices to solidifying a student's first full-time job. The idea of curriculum is typically integrated straight in to the curriculum of one's business education. This allows the students to focus on both at the same time while also understanding the importance of thinking of their life after school has on their life. Additionally, it allows students to think more about their goals and interests to determine if their current path of academics is what they wish to continue. Many faculty members will typically reach out to students and attempt to connect to graduates. This connects the current students with alumni in their field, allowing them to hear from people in their career path who were in their place not too long ago. This information lets students understand what is necessary to do in order to succeed in their desired career. There are instances however, where the effort of career development while still obtaining a degree does not yield a desire result. Research of business undergraduates state that only about 60% obtain a full-time job by graduation and of that percentage, only 40% have one that is consistent with their major.

== Collaboration with industry ==
Collaboration between educational institutions and industry is becoming essential in shaping relevant business education. Many business schools are partnering with companies to develop curricula that align with workforce needs, ensuring graduates possess the skills required by employers. This trend includes creating online certificate programs that allow professionals to upskill without committing to full degree programs, thus providing pathways for continuous learning.

== See also ==
- Business game
- Business school
- Entrepreneurship education
- Executive education
- GMAT
- Training simulation
- Related education articles:
  - Accounting articles
  - Economics articles
  - Finance articles
  - Management articles
  - Investment articles
