= School of Business and Management of Technology of BSU =

Business School in Belarus

School of Business BSU
- Институт Бизнеса БГУ
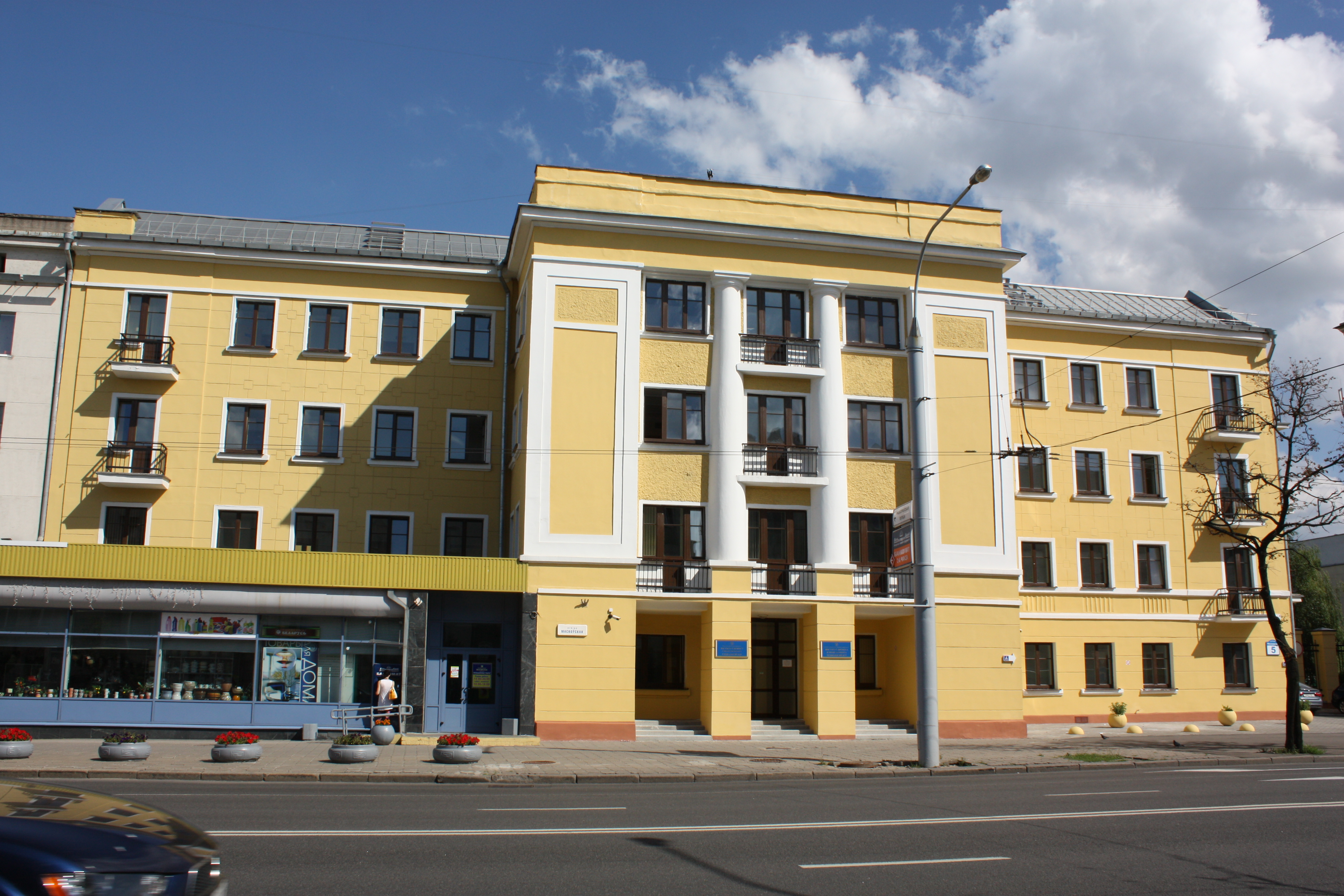
- Сampus of School of Business BSU on Moskovskaya 5 str.

Location
- 7 Oboynaya Str, Minsk, Belarus; 53.906°N 27.546°E

Information
- Type: Public
- Established: 2018 as SB BSU, 1996 as SBMT BSU
- School district: Minsk, BY
- Enrollment: 2090 (Figures from Fall 2023)
- Information: +375 (17) 350-00-20
- Website: https://sb.bsu.by/en

The School of Business of Belarusian State University (Belarusian: Інстытут бізнесу БДУ, Russian: Институт бизнеса БГУ), was established in April 1996.

Over 3500 people have graduated from School of Business of BSU, with more than 700 acquiring their Master's Degree or Specialist's Degrees, over 1200 completing Advanced Training courses, and 1500 having improved their professional skills. Currently, over 2800 students are enrolled in various School of Business of BSU's programs.

== School structure ==
There are seven program departments, each with their own chairperson, in the fields of:

- Business Administration
- Logistics
- Marketing
- Information Resources Management
- Finance and Management
- Innovation management
- Law and Humanitarian Subjects

School of Business of BSU also offers a Center of Distance Learning, a Center of Informational Technologies, an English Language Center, and a regional campus in Orsha.

== History ==
The demand for highly skilled Business specialists during the dawn of the market economy in Belarus led to the creation of the first business school. However, at that time, the Belarusian education system was not as equipped compared to the universities in developed countries. SBMT BSU modeled courses after these international schools of Business while fitting the program to realism of the Belarusian economy. Within the first years of operation, every member of the SBMT BSU faculty underwent advanced training in the USA and returned home to develop curriculums for their own programs.

For the first six years, courses were conducted in English only. The reasons for this are that the professors were trained in English, the teaching materials available at that time were written in English and time was needed for translation, and the English proficiency was attractive for those wanting a modern business education. Wishing to further other educational establishments, regional offices of international companies were started all over Belarus, creating joint ventures between the schools and businesses. Throughout the years, various courses have been taught by international specialists as well as by visiting professors from France, Sweden, and the US.

Today SBMT BSU offers bachelor's degrees in Russian and English languages, "Logistics", and "Management of Informational Resources". Master of Business Administration degree programs are also available. For top managers and specialists, Advanced Training and Professional Skill Improvement opportunities exist in the fields of scientific and innovational activities, which are carried out within the framework of Belarus' state program of Innovational Development.(in Russian)

=== Timeline ===
- 1996 Launch of the joint Belarusian-American project "Program on Economics and Management of Technology" (PEMT) introduced by BSU and the USA's University of Colorado's Economics Institute.
- 1998 First master's program graduates in the field of "Management".
- 1999 Launch of the Master of Business Administration (MBA) program. Commencement of the Advanced Training Program "Finance and Bank Loans" students.
- 2002 SBMT and Royal Philips Electronics of the Netherlands sign an agreement starting a joint educational project in Advanced Training Program "Computer Science".
- 2003 SBMT graduates receive Master of Business Administration degrees for the first time in Belarusian history.
- 2010 Creation of the English Language Center. Launch of the Advanced Training Program "Logistics"
- 2011 SBMT acquires certification in the quality management system necessary to meet international standards for ISO 9001 in the national system of certification as well as the German state system certification (TGA)(in Russian). Start of training for specialists in "Management of Informational Resources".
- 2017 SBMT became a member of the Association to Advance Collegiate Schools of Business (AACSB). The School of business and management of technology of BSU is the first business school in Belarus, admitted to membership in the AACSB International.

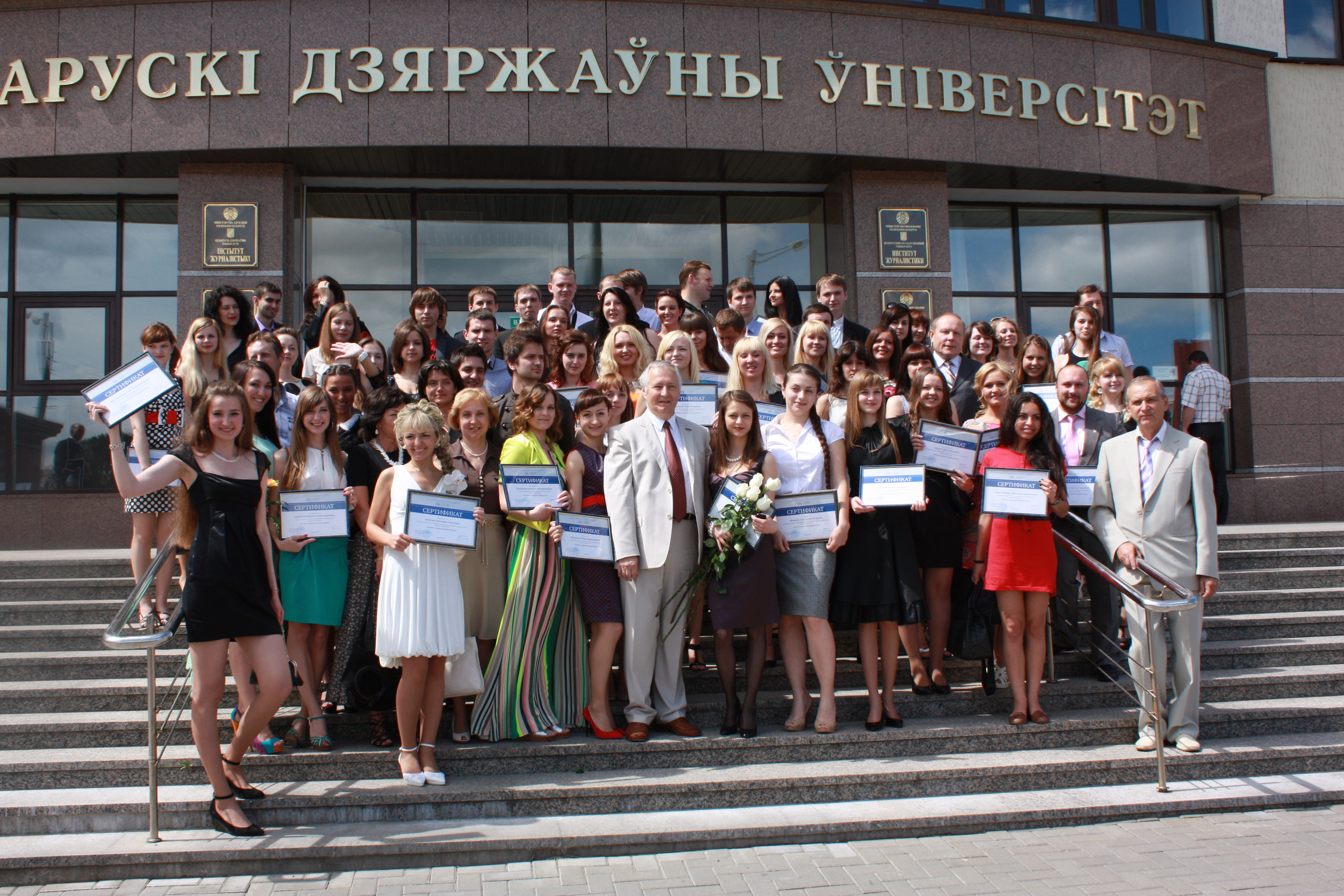
Bachelors celebrating the graduation, June 2012

== School of Business of BSU's Bachelor's degrees ==
- Business Administration in Russian and English languages
- Logistics in Russian and English languages
- Informational Resources Management in Russian and English languages
- Marketing in Russian and English languages

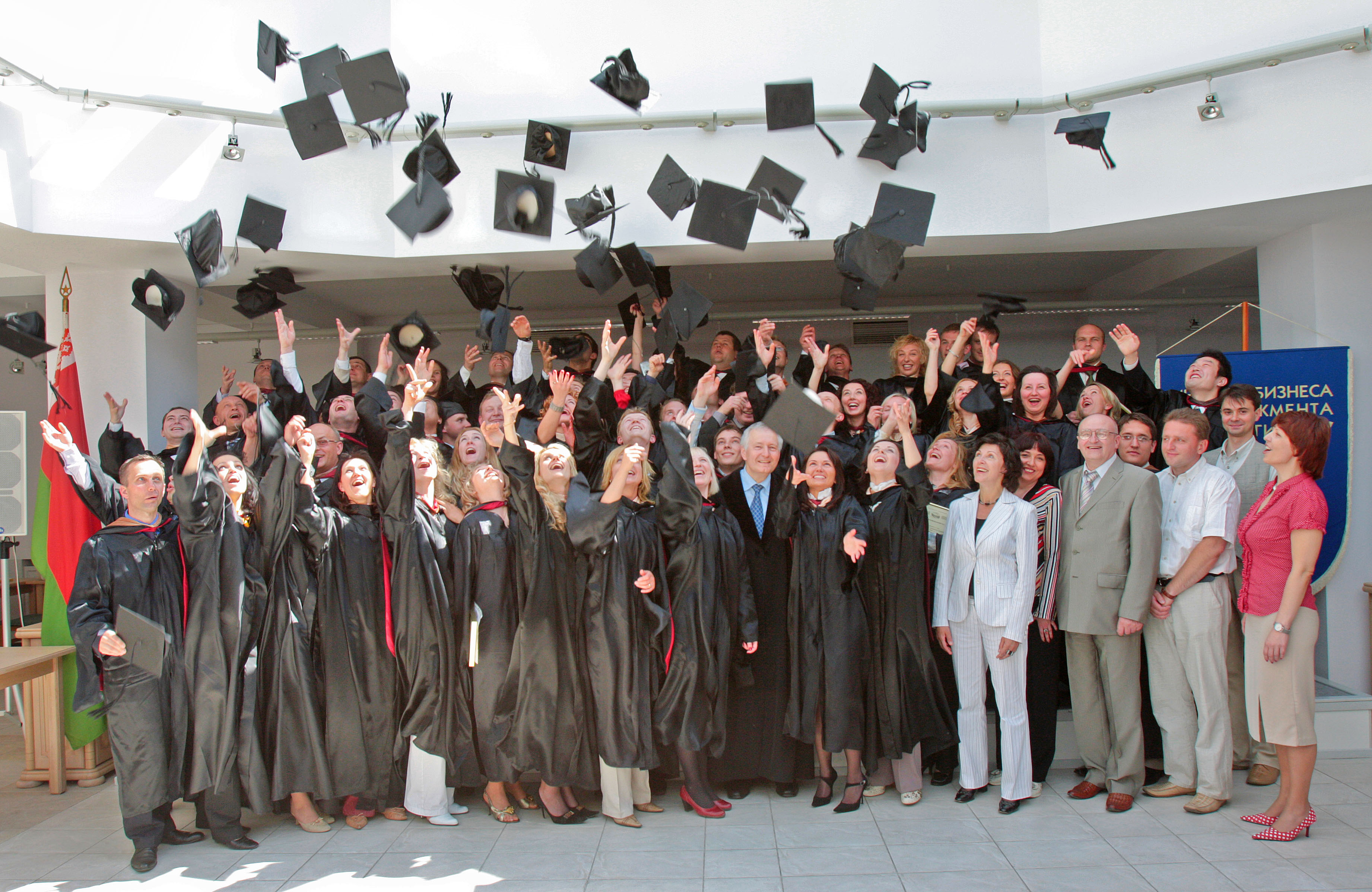
MBA graduation ceremony in June 2008

== School of Business of BSU's Master's degrees ==
School of Business of BSU offers 7 Master's programs in English and 13 programs in Russian.

Programs in English

- Financial Management
- Project Management
- HR management
- Digital Business Management
- Finance and Credit
- Marketing Communications in Digital Economics
- Innovation Management

Programs in Russian

- «Legal support of economic activities»
- «Banking and Finance»
- «Management in social and economic systems»
- «Business Administration»
- «Innovative Management»
- «Property management»
- «Logistics (Digital Logistics)»
- «Marketing»
- «Personnel Management»
- «Finance Management»
- «Bank Business Management»
- «Design of complex integrated systems»

== Advanced training programs ==
=== Mini-master ===
- Data Analysis
- Internet Trading
- General Management
- Corporate Finance
- Project Management
- Digital Business Management

Linguistic Support of Business

== Centers for Learning and Development ==
=== Center for Distant Learning and Information Technologies ===
The center, established in 2007, creates an informational and education basis for School of Business of BSU, advancing methodological and scientific purposes in the spheres of distant learning and information technologies within the School.

=== English Language Center ===
School of Business of BSU’s English Language Center, established with the help and support of Riga Business School, provides various levels of English education, including eight levels of general English, two of business English, as well as preparation classes for the TOEFL exam.

=== Career Development Center ===
The Career Development Center motivates students and graduates to self-plan and structure their career goals, helps them to adapt to the contemporary labor market, and ensures full professional career realization. The main purpose is to assist graduates in finding employment and developing careers after graduation, as well as connecting employers with potential employees.

== School of Business of BSU's International cooperation ==
International cooperation is one of the stated aims of the School. For more than 15 years the School has developed relations with numerous foreign universities and business schools.

The first educational project for the School Program in Economics and Management of Technology was the result of successful realization of international project in co-operation with the Economics Institute of University of Colorado Boulder, USA. The joint cooperation with American colleagues, supported for this project through the Eurasia Foundation, favoured the creation of the first Master's level business education that corresponded to the international standards both in form and content and had great potential for its self-support. The program made it possible to get an American master's degree. Cooperation with Kingston University, UK, as part of a regional cooperation project (REAP) provided new opportunities for training teachers, developing new courses and preparing instructional materials in business subjects.

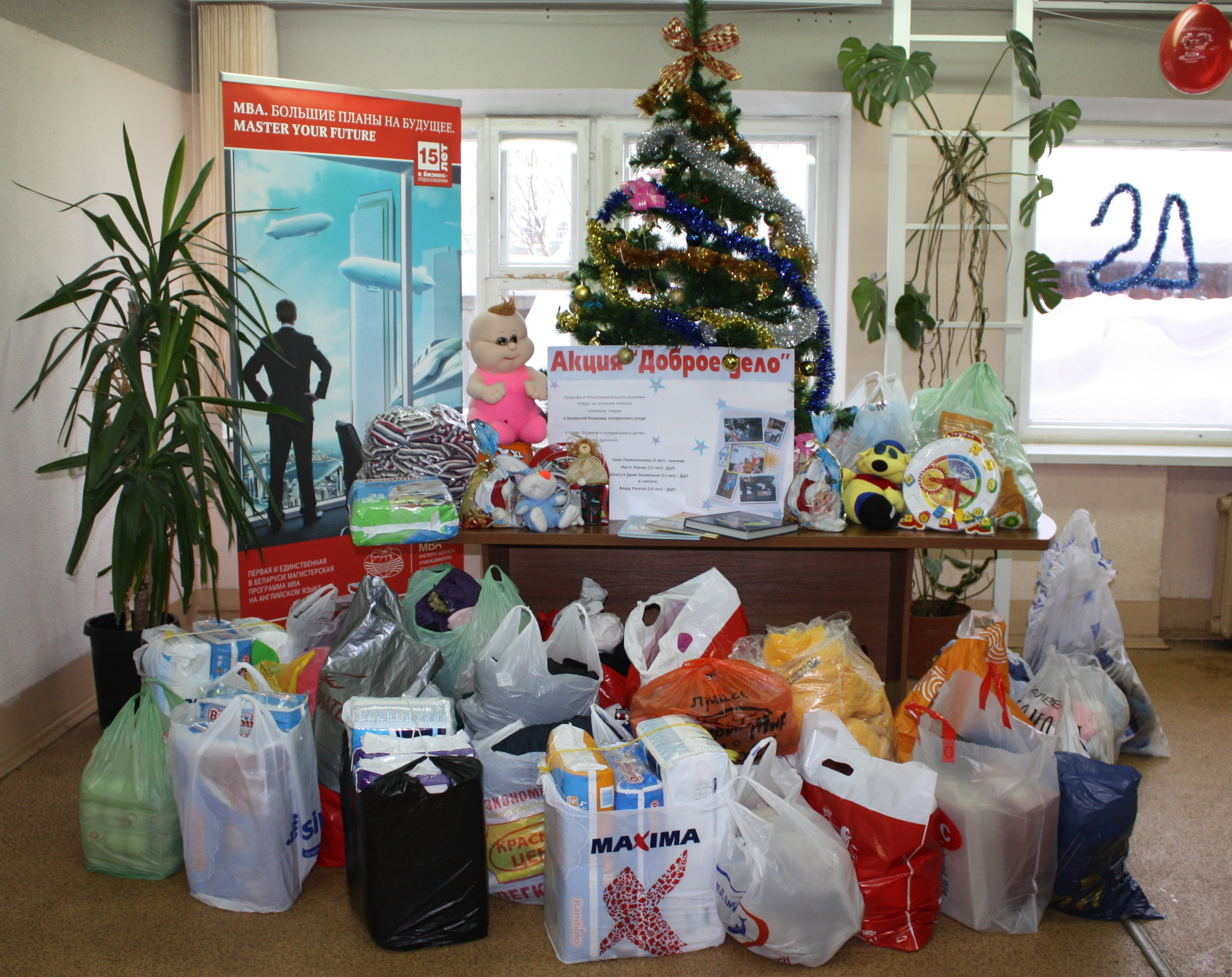
"Acts of Kindness" fundraiser for orphans in December 2012

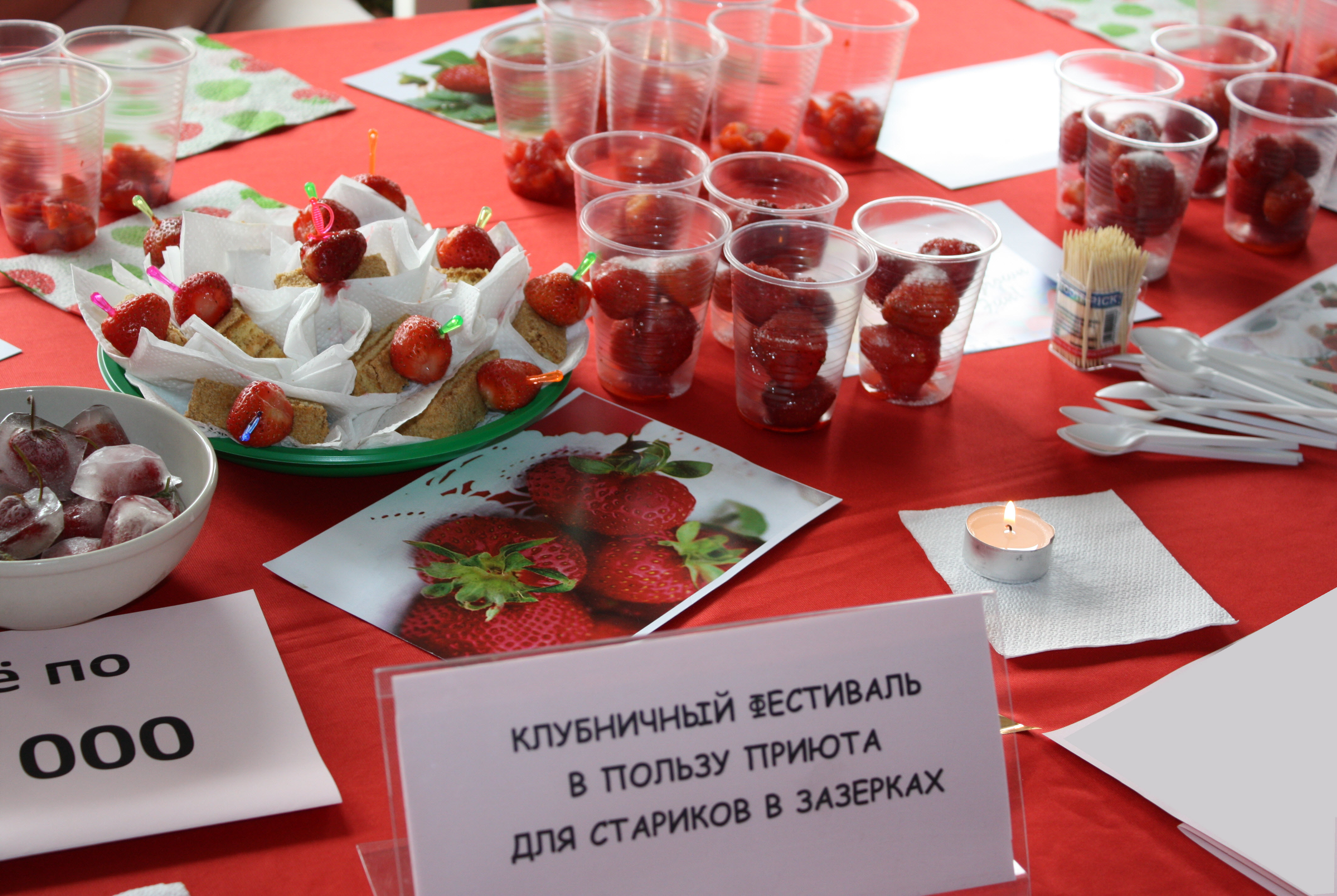
Charity Strawberry Fest SBMT BSU, June 2012

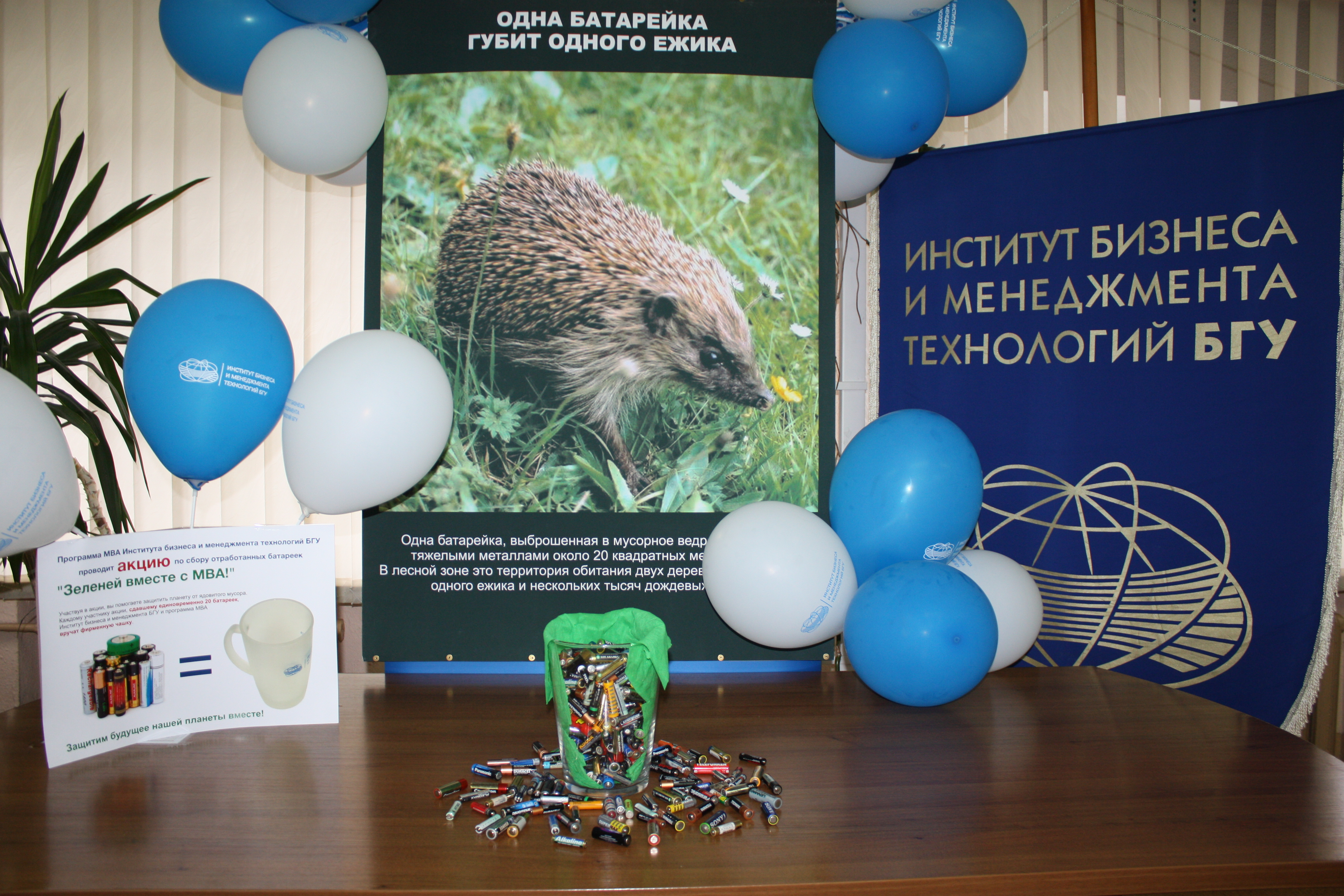
"Going Green with MBA" campaign for recycling used batteri

== School's charity work ==
"Act of Kindness" started more than 10 years ago as an ongoing charity project. Today the project exists in the form of continuous arrangements for fund-raising for children from a local orphanage and the elderly at the Minsk region retirement home. Traditional social activities include the freshman initiation ceremony, Christmas program meetings, graduation ceremonies, and the annual Strawberry Festival.(in Russian)(in Russian)

== School of Business of BSU in world rankings ==
As of June 2012, the "Ranking Web of Business Schools" website ranked SBMT BSU as second in Belarus and 416th out of over 1,500 Business Schools worldwide.
