= Chantelle Bell =

British biotechnologist and businesswoman

- Born: United Kingdom
- Education: Newnham College, University of Cambridge, and University of Essex

Chantelle Bell is a British entrepreneur and a graduate of the Bioscience Enterprise postgraduate course at The University of Cambridge.

In 2018, Bell was named as one of Forbes Top 50 women in Tech for Europe. Bell was also named to the Financial Times' list of the 'Top 100 minority ethnic leaders in technology.'

Financial Times list: The UK’s top 100 black and minority ethnic leaders in technology

== Education ==
Between 2012 and 2016, Bell studied Genetics at The University of Essex. Between 2016 and 2017, Bell joined The University of Cambridge as a Master's student in Bioscience Enterprise.

Bell co-founded, together with fellow female founder Anya Roy, Syrona Women while they were studying Bioscience Enterprise at Cambridge University. Syrona is a pregnancy-test like device that allows women to test themselves for cervical cancer at home.

== Awards ==
Bell and co-founder Roy have won awards from AccelerateHER Scotland, Tata, and Bethnal Green Ventures.
