= JD–MBA =

Dual degree program offered jointly by some law and business schools

A JD–MBA is a dual degree program in which a student concurrently earns Juris Doctor and Master of Business Administration degrees from a university's graduate law school and business school. JD–MBA programs are commonly offered in the United States and Canada. They integrate legal and business training through a structured cross-credit system that allows certain approved courses to count toward the requirements for both degrees. This enables students to complete both the three-year JD program and the two-year MBA program in four years, instead of the five years the degrees would take if done consecutively.

== By country ==
=== Canada ===
Top-ranking Canadian JD–MBA programs include a four-year JD–MBA at the University of British Columbia, University of Toronto, York University, Queen's University, the three-year JD–MBA at the University of Western Ontario and the three-and-a-half-year JD–MBA at the University of Ottawa. Students may apply to the joint program before matriculating to either program, or after matriculating to either law school or business school.

=== United States ===
Many schools in the US offer JD–MBA programs. There are three common lengths of time offered for JD–MBA programs: three-year, three-and-a-half-year, or four-year. All schools listed below with three- or three-and-a-half-year programs also offer a four-year option for the program. Schools listed under the four-year programs only offer a four-year (eight-semester) program.

==== Three-year programs ====
Three-year programs can usually be completed in six semesters. Most programs allow for two summer internships; however, some require students to take classes for at least one summer. Here are some schools that offer three-year JD–MBA programs:

- Belmont University
- Columbia University
- George Mason University
- Northwestern University
- Southern Methodist University
- Temple University
- University of Chicago
- University of Georgia
- University of Notre Dame
- University of Pennsylvania
- University of Richmond
- Saint Louis University

==== Three-and-a-half-year programs ====
Three-and-a-half-year programs are supposed to be completed in seven semesters. Here are some schools that offer three-and-a-half-year JD–MBA programs:

- Boston University
- Duke University
- Emory University
- University of South Carolina

==== Four-year programs ====
Four-year programs can be completed in eight semesters. Here are some schools that offer only four-year JD–MBA programs:

- Brigham Young University
- College of William & Mary
- Cornell University
- Elon University
- Fordham University
- Georgetown University
- Harvard University
- Liberty University
- New York University
- Northeastern University
- Pepperdine University
- Santa Clara University
- Stanford University
- University at Buffalo
- University of California, Berkeley
- University of Houston
- University of Missouri
- University of Texas at Austin
- University of Utah
- University of Wyoming
- Villanova University
- Yale University

== See also ==
- PhD-MBA
