= Australian MBA Star Ratings =

The Graduate Management Association of Australia produces and publishes its annual GMAA Master of Business Administration (MBA) Star Rating it says details a survey of business schools in Australia.

The current Star Ratings and the Methodology of Assessment is available at.
