= Pauline Marcelle =

- Born: Pauline Marcelle; July 21, 1964 (age 61); Calibishie, Dominica
- Education: University of Applied Arts, Vienna
- Known for: painting, photography, video and sculpture
- Notable work: BEND DOWN BOUTIQUE

Pauline Marcelle (born 21 July 1964 in Dominica, West Indies) is a contemporary Caribbean artist. She works in a variety of media including painting, sculpture, video and is also a lyricist and songwriter.

== Life ==
Marcelle studied art at the University for Applied Arts in Vienna, Austria in the 1990s and is primarily known for her works in painting and video. Her works reflects much on the thematic subject of human meetings and encounters, their variety, interaction and influential effects of the social surrounding, to which they are subjected. Pauline Marcelle is primarily known for her strong expressive paintings, in which she connects the intensity of modern art with the expressivity and figuration of her Caribbean origin. She lives and works in Dominica and Vienna, Austria.

== Works ==
- Bend Down Boutique (2008–2016), painting series
- Floating Picnic (2007), raft installation Dumbo Art Center
- The Eatings (2004), three piece video installation
- What's That Got to Do with Me? (2003), photography-video installation
- Double Six (2001) multimedia video installation
- Paradogs (2000), multimedia video installation
