= Sean Douglas (politician) =

Dominican politician

Sean Douglas is a Dominican politician and businessman. He served as the press secretary for the ruling Dominica Labour Party for nine years, ending in 2010. He then became a critic of the party in 2011. He was appointed as an opposition senator in 2023, before his appoint was revoked the same year.

== Biography ==
Sean Douglas is a nephew of former Prime Minister Rosie Douglas and a cousin of MP Ian Douglas.

After the death of Rosie Douglas, Sean Douglas first began serving as the press secretary for the ruling Dominica Labour Party (DLP) under Prime Minister Pierre Charles. He served 9 years as party press secretary. In 2010, Douglas refused to sign an outdated contract. On 12 July 2010, he had received a letter from Cabinet Secretary Felix Gregoire informing him of his dismissal. Douglas described it as being "fired". Gregoire argued that by refusing to sign the contract, Douglas was effectively firing himself. His dismissal was made effective 13 August.

By July 2010, it had been reported that Douglas had come into conflict with the administration of Prime Minister Roosevelt Skerrit. A year after his dismissal, in August 2011, Douglas criticized the Skerrit administration, claiming that it was corrupt, nepositic, and that Skerrit was forming a cult of personality around himself. He claimed the reason behind his firing as press secretary was political. After his criticism of the government, he gained traction with the opposition United Workers' Party (UWP). In May 2019, ahead of that year's general election, Douglas endorsed the candidates of the UWP.

On 13 January 2023, following the 2022 general election, Douglas was appointed as senator, selected by independent Opposition Leader Jesma Paul-Victor. On 6 November 2023, Paul-Victor sent a letter to President Sylvanie Burton calling for the immediate revocation of Douglas's appointment as senator. In April 2024, Chalika Vidal was sworn in as his successor.
