= Jasmine Marcelin =

Dominica-born physician

Jasmine R. Marcelin
- Born: Roseau, Dominica
- Education: St. Mary's University; American University of Antigua College of Medicine; Mayo Clinic
- Known for: Using social media to increase recognition and awareness of infectious disease information
- Awards: Elected Fellow of American College of Physicians, Distinguished Mentor Award
- Scientific career
- Fields: Infectious disease
- Workplaces: University of Nebraska Medical Center

Jasmine R. Marcelin is a Caribbean-American infectious disease physician and an Assistant Professor in the Department of Internal Medicine at the University of Nebraska Medical Center (UNMC). Marcelin is also the Associate Medical Director of the Antimicrobial Stewardship Program and as well as the Co-Director of Digital Innovation and Social Media Strategy at UNMC.

== Early life and education ==
Marcelin was born on the island of Dominica in the Caribbean. She grew up in Antigua, where she began to develop an interest in infectious disease. In high school, Marcelin explored the epidemiology of mosquito-born infectious diseases. Marcelin moved to Canada in 2002 to pursue her undergraduate degree at St. Mary's University in Halifax, Nova Scotia. She completed a double major in Biology and Chemistry and also obtained a Diploma in Forensic Science from St. Mary's. She was also on the track team at St. Mary's while in college. In 2006, after completing her Bachelors of Science, Marcelin pursued her medical training at the American University of Antigua College of Medicine.

She completed her medical training in 2011, becoming the Valedictorian of her medical class. Following her medical training, Marcelin pursued her residency in Internal Medicine at the Mayo Clinic in Rochester, Minnesota. During her residency, Marcelin found her passion for practicing infectious disease medicine. She obtained her board certification in Internal Medicine in 2014 and then completed her Fellowship in Infectious Diseases at the Mayo Clinic in 2017.

== Career and research ==
In 2017, Marcelin was recruited to the University of Nebraska Medical Center, and was appointed Assistant Professor of Medicine in the Division of Infectious Diseases. She is Associate Medical Director of the Antimicrobial Stewardship Program and she was also appointed Co-Director of the Digital Innovation and Social Medical Strategy in the Division of Infectious Disease. As Associate Director of the Antimicrobial Stewardship residency program, Marcelin educates and supports future residents in this field. Marcelin's clinical practice in infectious disease focuses on treating skin and soft tissue infections as well as caring for patients with HIV.

In addition to her roles at the University of Nebraska Medical Center, Marcelin is a member of the Inclusion, Diversity, Access and Equity Taskforce and the Vice Chair for Digital Strategy Advisory Group for the Infectious Diseases Society of America (IDSA). She is a member of the Medical Scholars Program Committee and the Medical Education Community of Practice for IDSA.

=== Social media and infectious disease ===
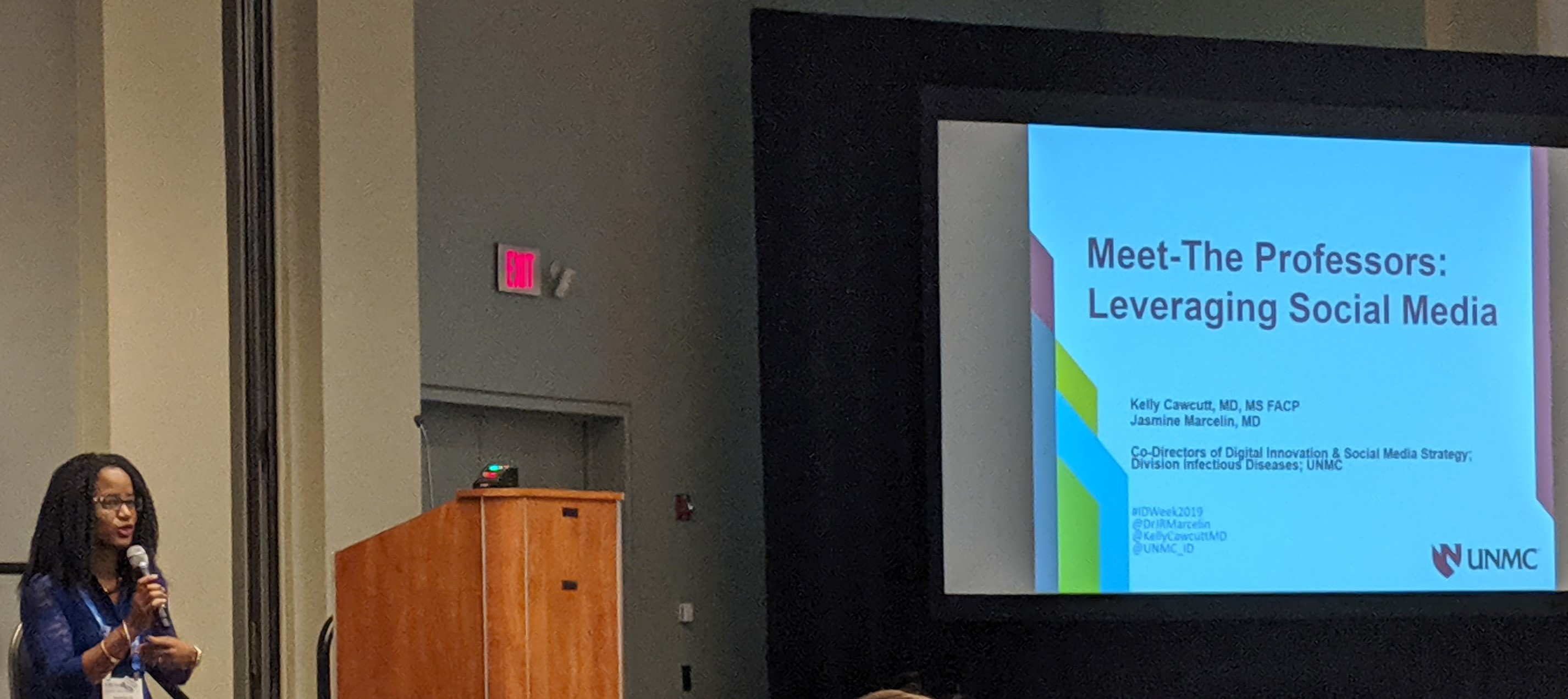
Jasmine R. Marcelin leads Meet the Professor session at 2019 meeting of Infectious Diseases Society of American meeting (IDSA 2019) in Washington, D.C.

Marcelin uses social media to advance the field of infectious disease as well as advocate for diversity, equity, and inclusion in medicine. Marcelin is the founding vice-chair of the Digital Strategy Advisory Group for IDSA and in this role she uses social media as a way to engage the community through enhancing collaborations and discussions of new findings and literature. In 2019, Marcelin published an article with her collaborators discussing how social media platforms can be leveraged to increase the speed and reach of research in infectious disease and antimicrobial stewardship.

=== Advocacy ===
Marcelin advocated for diversity, equity, and inclusion in medicine and conducts research and publishes articles to support her work. Marcelin also proposed the "Be Ethical Campaign" where she challenged leaders in healthcare to document gaps in equity in the workplace and move towards closing these gaps. Marcelin educates her community on the presence and impact of unconscious bias in the workplace. She wrote an article that explained how unconscious biases can perpetuate inequalities in healthcare and she described the various types of bias that exist in healthcare. Marcelin co-authored papers on the barriers that exist for women in pediatrics.

== Awards and honors ==
- 2018 Race Against Resistance Scholar
- 2018 Top Teacher Infectious Diseases Fellowship
- 2019 Bronze Fellowship Mayo Clinic Social Media Network https://socialmedia.mayoclinic.org/2019/03/27/new-mcsmn-bronze-fellow-jasmine-marcelin-m-d/
- 2019 Student Senate Distinguished Mentor Award University of Nebraska Medical Center
- 2019 Top Teacher Internal Medicine Residency
- 2020 Elected Fellow of American College of Physicians
- 2020 Minority Faculty Leadership Award

== Select media ==
- 2018 Doximity Network opinion editorial "Do Women in Academic Infectious Diseases Need to Win Nobel Prizes to be Promoted?"
- 2018 Helio Infectious Diseases News "Women in ID push against glass ceiling"
- 2018 Physician's Weekly article "Dear Stewardship People: Can't We All Just Get Along?"
- 2020 Forbes article "'I Am Tired': What Black Doctors Need You To Know Right Now"
- 2020 Physician's Weekly article "The Weekly Corona with Dr. Raquel Lamarche"

== Select publications ==
- Marcelin JR, Beam E, Razonable RR. "Cytomegalovirus infection in liver transplant recipients: updates on clinical management". World J Gastroenterol. 2014;20(31):10658-10667. doi:10.3748/wjg.v20.i31.10658
- Marcelin JR, Tan EM, Marcelin A, et al. "Assessment and improvement of HIV screening rates in a Midwest primary care practice using an electronic clinical decision support system: a quality improvement study". BMC Med Inform Decis Mak. 2016;16:76. Published July 4, 2016. doi:10.1186/s12911-016-0320-5
- Marcelin JR, Bares SH, Fadul N. "Improved Infectious Diseases Physician Compensation but Continued Disparities for Women and Underrepresented Minorities". Open Forum Infect Dis. 2019;6(2):ofz042. Published February 4, 2019. doi:10.1093/ofid/ofz042
- "Using social media to disseminate research in infection prevention, hospital epidemiology, and antimicrobial stewardship". Cawcutt, K. A., Marcelin, J. R., Silver, J. K.; Infection control and hospital epidemiology. August 28, 2019
- Jasmine R Marcelin, Jennifer Manne-Goehler, Julie K Silver, "Supporting Inclusion, Diversity, Access, and Equity in the Infectious Disease Workforce", The Journal of Infectious Diseases, Volume 220, Issue Supplement_2, September 15, 2019, Pages S50–S61, https://doi.org/10.1093/infdis/jiz213
- "Women in Pediatrics: Progress, Barriers, and Opportunities for Equity, Diversity, and Inclusion". Spector, N. D., Asante, P. A., Marcelin, J. R., Poorman, J. A., Larson, A. R., Salles, A., Oxentenko, A. S., Silver, J. K.; Pediatrics. September 25, 2019
- "Let Me Tell You What I Wish I'd Known When I Was Young: A Letter to New Physicians". Marcelin, J. R., Salles, A., O'Glasser, A. Y.; Journal of graduate medical education. February 2020
- Marcelin JR, Chung P, Van Schooneveld TC. "Antimicrobial stewardship in the outpatient setting: A review and proposed framework" [published online ahead of print, April 28, 2020]. Infect Control Hosp Epidemiol. 2020;1-8. doi:10.1017/ice.2020.94
