= Graduate Management Association of Australia =

The Graduate Management Association of Australia (GMAA) is the nationally recognised umbrella Professional Association for graduates having MBA, DBA and other postgraduate business management qualifications in Australia.

The GMAA has members with MBA, DBA and other postgraduate management qualifications from approved Australian and international programs residing in all states of Australia and overseas. Members include directors, senior managers, functional specialists and consultants from business and government as well as business academics.

Through this membership, the GMAA forms the bridge between the business world and management education, thus providing MBA graduates and students with a platform to further their career as a member of the Association with unique networking opportunities.

== About the GMAA ==
The Graduate Management Association of Australia Inc (GMAA - sometimes GMA) was established as a national entity in October 1993. It originated from an amalgamation of the Graduate Management Association Limited (NSW), the MBA Society Inc. University of Adelaide, The Graduate Management Association (Victoria), the Queensland Master of Business Administration Association and the Graduate Management Association University of Western Australia.

The GMAA has members with MBA, DBA and other postgraduate management qualifications from approved Australian and international programs residing in all states of Australia and overseas. The GMAA operates through a National Committee of State representatives from State Chapters, with the following charter:

== Mission ==
The GMAA's mission is to promote the standing and enhance the value of MBA, DBA and other postgraduate management qualifications.

== Objectives ==
- Promote the standing of graduate schools of management in Australia.
- Enhance the value of graduate management qualifications in Australia.
- Contribute to the development of Australia and its managerial resources.
- Provide a forum for the interaction of members and students from various management schools.
- The continuing development of members by actively pursuing the regular exchange of ideas and knowledge between members and leaders in industry and management education.
- Maintain the position of being the nationally recognised Professional Association for MBA, DBA and other postgraduate business management qualifications in Australia.

== Star rating ==
The GMAA produces and publishes the annual Australian MBA Star Ratings with a detailed survey of business schools in Australia.
