= Master of Business Administration =

Master's degree in business leadership

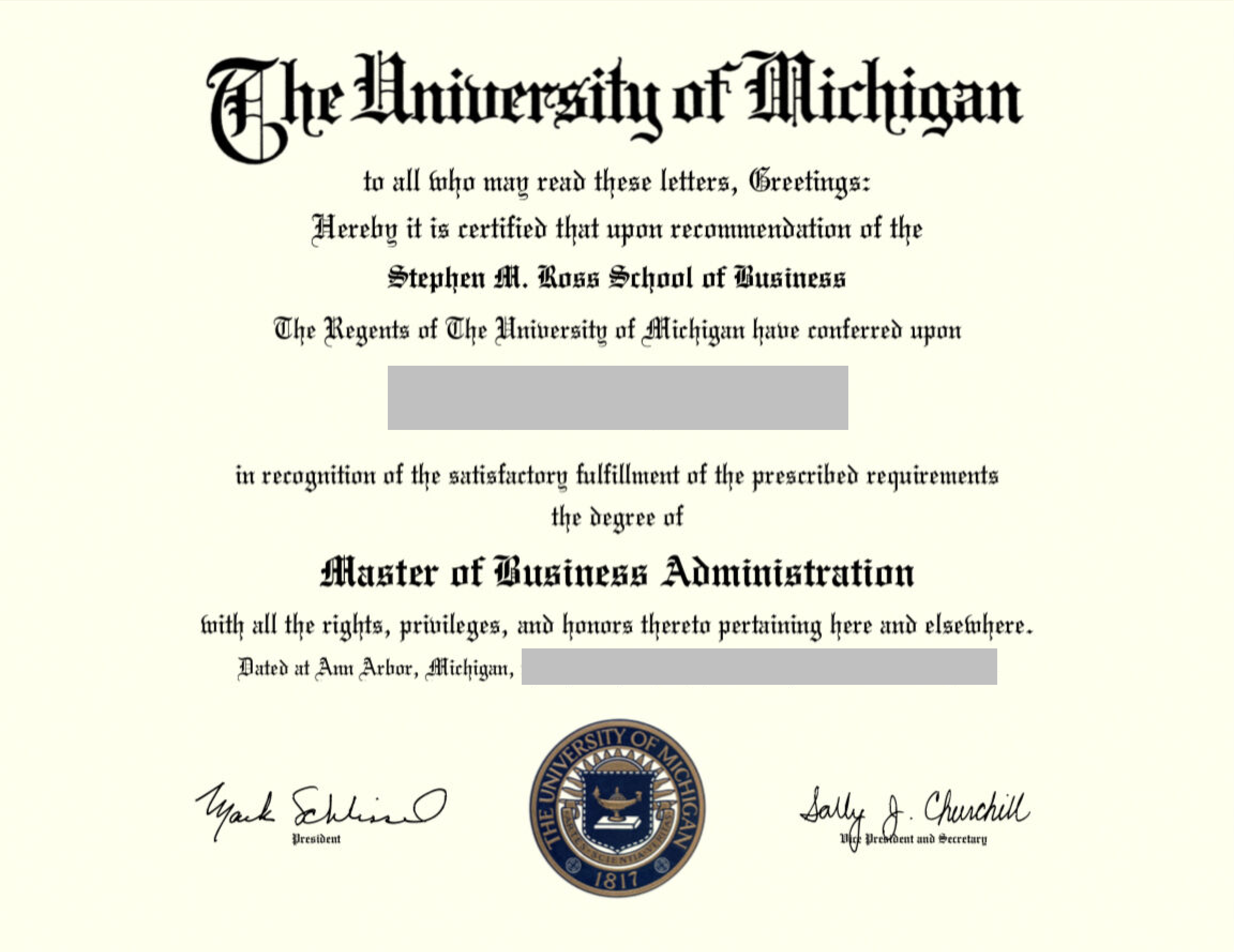
A Master of Business Administration diploma from the University of Michigan

A Master of Business Administration (MBA) is a professional degree focused on business administration. The core courses in an MBA program cover various areas of business administration; elective courses may allow further study in a particular area but an MBA is normally intended to be a general program. It originated in the United States in the early 20th century when the country industrialized and companies sought scientific management.

MBA programs in the United States typically require completing about forty to sixty semester credit hours, much higher than the thirty semester credit hours typically required for other US master's degrees that cover some of the same material. The UK-based Association of MBAs accreditation requires "the equivalent of at least 1,800 hours of learning effort", equivalent to 45 US semester credit hours or 90 European ECTS credits, the same as a standard UK master's degree. Accreditation bodies for business schools and MBA programs ensure consistency and quality of education. Business schools in many countries offer programs tailored to full-time, part-time, executive (abridged coursework typically occurring on nights or weekends) and distance learning students, many with specialized concentrations.

An "Executive MBA", or EMBA, is a degree program similar to an MBA program that is specifically structured for and targeted towards corporate executives and senior managers who are already in the workforce.

== History ==
In 1900, the Tuck School of Business was founded at Dartmouth College offering the first advanced degree in business: the Master of Science in Commerce, a predecessor of the MBA. The first MBA was launched eight years later, at the Harvard Graduate School of Business Administration, with 15 faculty members, 33 regular students and 47 special students. Its first-year curriculum was based on Frederick Winslow Taylor’s theory of scientific management. The number of MBA students at Harvard increased quickly, from 80 in 1908, over 300 in 1920, and 1,070 in 1930. At this time, only American universities offered MBAs, although business schools offering other qualifications had existed in Europe since the 18th century.

Other milestones include:

- 1943: First Executive MBA (EMBA) program for working professionals at the University of Chicago Booth School of Business.
- 1950: First MBA outside of the United States, in Canada (Ivey Business School at The University of Western Ontario), followed by the University of Pretoria in South Africa in 1951.
- 1953: First MBA offered at an Asian school at the Indian Institute of Social Welfare and Business Management in Calcutta.
- 1957: First MBA in Europe, and the first one-year MBA, offered by INSEAD.
- 1963: First MBA program offered in the Spanish-speaking world by ESAN Graduate School of Business in Peru, South America, under the direction of the Stanford Graduate School of Business, United States. Sponsored by the United States Agency for International Development (USAID), at the request of former President John F. Kennedy, which organizes the main business schools in the United States to study and explore the possibilities of developing management education projects in Latin America. Thus, on July 25, 1963, la Escuela de Administración de Negocios para Graduados-ESAN was founded, within the framework of an agreement between the governments of Peru and the United States to offer the master's program in Business Administration for interested applicants from all over Latin America.
- 1963: First MBA offered in Korea by Korea University Business School (KUBS).
- 1987: First online MBA offered by Aspen University. This is also claimed by Athabasca University in 1994.

== Accreditation ==
Globally, the three most important accreditations of MBA programs and business schools are the Association to Advance Collegiate Schools of Business (AACSB), Association of MBAs (AMBA), and the EFMD Quality Improvement System (EQUIS), with holding all three of these being known as triple accreditation. Of these, AMBA offers programmatic accreditation for MBAs and other graduate degrees, while the others take a broader view, offering accreditation of the school rather than the MBA program (EFMD also offers programmatic accreditation, separately from EQUIS).

=== United States ===
Business school or MBA program accreditation by external agencies provides students and employers with an independent view of the school or program's quality, as well as whether the curriculum meets specific quality standards. Currently the three major accrediting bodies in the United States are:

- Association to Advance Collegiate Schools of Business (AACSB)
- Accreditation Council for Business Schools and Programs (ACBSP)
- International Assembly for Collegiate Business Education (IACBE)

All of these groups also accredit schools outside the U.S. The ACBSP and the IACBE are themselves recognized in the United States by the Council for Higher Education Accreditation (CHEA). MBA programs with specializations for students pursuing careers in healthcare management also eligible for accreditation by the Commission on the Accreditation of Healthcare Management Education (CAHME).

U.S. MBA programs may also be accredited at the institutional level. Bodies that accredit institutions as a whole include:

- Middle States Association of Colleges and Schools (MSA)
- New England Association of Schools and Colleges (NEASC)
- Higher Learning Commission (HLC)
- Distance Education Accrediting Commission (DEAC)
- Northwest Commission on Colleges and Universities (NWCCU)
- Southern Association of Colleges and Schools (SACS)
- Western Association of Schools and Colleges (WASC)

== Africa ==
Financial Times, in its Executive Education Rankings for 2012, included five African business schools.

=== Nigeria ===
In Nigeria, business schools administered as colleges within the traditional universities offer a variety of MBA programs. In addition, a few standalone business schools allied with foreign business schools exist in Nigeria.

=== South Africa ===
In South Africa, South Africa's Council on Higher Education (CHE) completed an extensive re-accreditation of MBA degrees offered in the country in 2004.

=== Ghana ===
In Ghana, business schools of the traditional universities run a variety of MBA programs. Foreign accredited institutions offer MBA degrees by distance learning in Ghana.

=== Kenya ===
MBA programs in Kenya are offered in many public and private universities.

Students choose to specialize in one of the following areas: accounting, finance, entrepreneurship, insurance, and human resources. The course takes four semesters of about four months each.

== Asia ==
International MBA programs are acquiring brand value in Asia. For example, while a foreign MBA is still preferred in the Philippines, many students are now studying at one of many "Global MBA" English language programs being offered. English-only MBA programs are also offered in Hong Kong, Indonesia, Malaysia, Singapore, South Korea, Taiwan, and Thailand. For international students who want a different experience, many Asian programs offer scholarships and discounted tuition to encourage an international environment in the classroom.

Rankings have been published for Asia Pacific schools by Asia Inc., which is a regional business magazine with distribution worldwide. The importance of MBA education in China has risen, too.

=== Bangladesh ===
There are now more than 50 business schools in Bangladesh offering the MBA, predominantly targeting graduates without any work experience. Most MBAs are two years full-time. Sensibly there is little use of GMAT. The Business Schools conduct their own admission tests instead although the rationale for this instead of providing introductory courses and certifications is unclear. Classes are taught in English.

=== China ===
In 1990, the Academic Degrees Office of the State Council formally approved the establishment of MBA degrees and piloted MBA education. In 1991, the Academic Degrees Office of the State Council approved 9 domestic colleges and universities to carry out MBA education pilot work. Since then, mainland China has successively approved more institutions for MBA education training unit. At present, a total of 229 colleges and universities have opened MBA programs in the system, with a total of more than 500 programs.

=== India ===
In India, an MBA degree is a 2-year postgraduate qualification. MBAs can be studied online and in-person.

There are many business schools and colleges in India offering two-year MBA programs accredited by AICTE or UGC. These include the Indian Institutes of Management (IIMs), of which there were 20 in total as of 2018.

=== Japan ===
In Japan, two business schools offer an accredited MBA degree (AACSB, AMBA, or EQUIS). The concept of an MBA is still not considered mainstream as traditional companies still perceive that knowledge and learning with respect to business and management can only be effectively gained through experience and not within a classroom. In fact, some companies have been known to place recent MBA recipients in unrelated fields, or try to re-acclimate their Japanese employees who have spent years overseas earning the degree. As a consequence, academic institutions in Japan are attempting to reinvent the perception of the MBA degree, by taking into account the local corporate culture.

=== Malaysia ===
In Malaysia, the MBA degree is highly valued by employers for its emphasis on practical skills and strategic thinking. It is often seen as a pathway to career advancement and increased earning potential.

Admission requirements for MBA programs in Malaysia typically include a bachelor's degree from a recognized institution, relevant work experience, and sometimes, standardized test scores such as the GMAT or GRE.

Both public and private universities offer MBA and EMBA degrees. Most MBAs are in full-time and part-time modes. All MBA degrees are fully conducted in English.

=== Nepal ===
In recent years, universities in Nepal are providing both general MBA for freshers and Executive MBA for working professionals. Apart from this, there is distance learning center that are providing online MBA course assosicated with abroad universities.

=== Pakistan ===
Pakistan first offered an MBA program outside the United States in 1955 in collaboration with the University of Pennsylvania in Philadelphia. Now in Pakistan, there are 187 Universities/Institutes which are recognized by the Higher Education Commission of Pakistan, offering MBA programs to students and professionals.

=== Singapore ===
Singapore has different MBA programs of high standing. The 3 national universities in Singapore have top MBA programs; Singapore Management University has triple accreditation, National University of Singapore is top 20 in the world according to the Financial Times MBA ranking and Nanyang Business School is ranked top 100 by The Economist. In addition, many international institutions such as INSEAD, ESSEC, EDHEC and others have a campus in Singapore where MBA programs, among others, are offered.

=== South Korea ===
Korean universities offer full-time and part-time MBA programs that usually consist of a two-year curriculum. The first MBA program was offered in 1963 by Korea University Business School (KUBS). In 2007, the Korean Government established "BK21", a project that supports Korean universities in order to develop their competitiveness in the global MBA market. Korea University Business School topped the evaluation of BK21 professional business graduate schools for six consecutive years. In the meantime, only two universities in Korea ranked in the "2015 Global Top 100 Executive MBA (EMBA) Rankings" conducted by UK Financial Times. Korea University Business School and Yonsei University ranked 27th and 45th worldwide, respectively.

== Europe ==
=== History ===
In 1957, INSEAD (Institut Européen d'Administration des Affaires, or European Institute of Business Administration) became the first European university to offer an MBA degree, and also pioneered the one-year (12-month) degree that has become standard across Europe. This was followed by Antwerp Management School (postgraduate program in business management) in 1959 and by ESADE Business School, University Culture Dublin and Trinity College Dublin in 1964. Also in 1964, IESE Business School launched the first two-year MBA in Europe.

Following the Franks Report in the UK in 1963, a number of British business schools were established in the 1960s offering MBA courses (initially called MSc courses at most institutions until rebranded in the 1970s), mostly at the new plate glass universities and former colleges of advanced technology that had become universities since 1960. The two major schools set up by the UK government as a direct result of the report were London Business School, which offered an MBA from 1966, and Manchester Business School, which opened in 1965 but did not offer an MBA until 1967. Both of these were two year courses, despite Franks' recommendation to pursue one-year master's degrees, and were initially called MScs rather than MBAs. The first course to actually bear the title of MBA was the 12-month course launched by the University of Strathclyde in 1966. Many other 12-month master's courses also started in the 1960s, including at Aston (as a diploma until 1975), Bradford (1968), City (1966), Cranfield (1968), Durham (1967) and Warwick (1968).

Elsewhere, MBAs were launched at the KU Leuven in 1968; and at the HEC School of Management in 1969.

The Association of MBAs was established in Britain in 1967 as the Business Graduates Association. It started accrediting British MBAs in 1983, expanding this to cover international schools and distance learning MBAs in 1990. Twelve UK business schools formed the Conference of University Management Schools (now the Chartered Association of Business Schools) in 1971.

The European Foundation for Management Development was founded in 1972 to promote management education in Europe, and had 193 members by 1973. It established the EFMD Quality Improvement System accreditation for business schools in 1997.

=== Austria ===
In Austria, MBA programs of private universities have to be accredited by the Austrian Accreditation Council (Österreichischer Akkreditierungsrat). State-run universities have no accreditation requirements, however, some of them voluntarily undergo accreditation procedures by independent bodies. There are also MBA programs of non-academic business schools, who are entitled by the Austrian government to offer these programs until the end of 2012 (Lehrgang universitären Charakters). Some non-academic institutions cooperate with state-run universities to ensure the legality of their degrees.

=== Czech Republic ===
In the Czech Republic, the first meeting of the Association of the Czech MBA Schools (CAMBAS) was held in January 1999. The association is housed within the Centre for Doctoral and Managerial Studies of UEP, Prague. All of the founding members of the association to have their MBA programs accredited by partner institutions in the United Kingdom or the United States.

=== Finland ===
In Finland, Master of Business Administration degrees are awarded by business schools of Aalto University, Hanken, University of Turku, University of Vaasa and University of Oulu. In Finnish this degree is called kauppatieteiden maisteri. Universities of applied sciences award degrees which in Finnish are called tradenomi (YAMK) but use the same English title "Master of Business Administration" as the ones awarded by business schools. Both degrees are recognized as higher education degrees in Finland, yet only the business school graduates are typically referred as "masters".

=== France and French-speaking countries ===
In France and the Francophone countries, including Belgium, Canada, Monaco, and Switzerland, the MBA degree programs at the public accredited schools are similar to those offered in the Anglo-Saxon countries. Most French Business Schools are accredited by the Conférence des Grandes écoles.

=== Germany ===
Germany was one of the last Western countries to adopt an MBA degree. In 1998, the Hochschulrahmengesetz (Higher Education Framework Act), a German federal law regulating higher education including the types of degrees offered, was modified to permit German universities to offer master's degrees. The traditional German degree in business administration was the Diplom in Betriebswirtschaft (Diplom-Kaufmann/Diplom-Kauffrau), But since 1999, bachelor's and master's degrees have gradually replaced the traditional degrees due to the Bologna process. Most German business schools now offer an MBA.

Most German states require that MBA degrees have to be accredited by one of the six agencies officially recognized by the German Akkreditierungsrat (accreditation council), the German counterpart to the American CHEA. The busiest of these six agencies (with respect to MBA degrees) is the Foundation for International Business Administration Accreditation (FIBAA). All universities themselves have to be institutionally accredited by the state (staatlich anerkannt).

=== Italy ===
In Italy, MBA programs at public accredited schools are similar to those offered elsewhere in Europe. Italian Business Schools are accredited by EQUIS and by ASFOR.

=== Poland ===
There are several MBA programs offered in Poland. Some of these are run as partnerships with European, American, or Canadian Universities. Others rely on their own faculty and enrich their courses by inviting visiting lecturers. Several MBA programs in Poland are also offered in English.

=== Portugal ===
Several business schools offer highly ranked MBA programs in Portugal. Portuguese MBA programs are increasingly internationally oriented, being taught in English.

=== Spain ===
Spain has a long history in offering MBA programs with three MBA programs frequently being ranked in the Top 25 worldwide by several international rankings. Spanish MBAs are culturally diverse and taught in English.

=== Switzerland ===
Several schools in Switzerland offer an MBA as full-time, part-time, and executive education programs. Some business schools offer MBA programs with specializations such as Finance and Healthcare, technology management, and others. As a country with four different national languages (German, French, Italian, and Romansh), Switzerland offers most of its programs in English to attract international students to the country.

=== Turkey ===
Postgraduate business education in Turkey began in 1954 with the one-year Executive Business Administration Program in collaboration with Harvard Business School, which followed the case study method. The first MBA program in Turkey was established in 1977. Today, six private and public business schools in Turkey hold accreditation from the Association to Advance Collegiate Schools of Business (AACSB), and one of them has obtained triple accreditation. Turkish MBAs, offered in both English and Turkish, are also included in international rankings such as those by the Financial Times, QS, THE, and Eduniversal. Two business schools in Turkey host chapters of Beta Gamma Sigma Business Honor Society.

=== Ukraine ===
Recently MBA programs appeared in Ukraine, where there are now about twenty schools of business offering a variety of MBA programs. Three of these are subsidiaries of European schools of business, while the remaining institutions are independent. Ukrainian MBA programs are concentrated mainly on particulars of business and management in Ukraine. For example, 2/3 of all case studies are based on real conditions of Ukrainian companies.

=== United Kingdom ===
The United Kingdom-based Association of MBAs (AMBA) was established in 1967 and is an active advocate for MBA degrees. The association's accreditation service is internationally recognized for all MBA, DBA, and Masters in Business and Management (MBM) programs. AMBA also offers the only professional membership association for MBA students and graduates.

UK MBA programs typically consist of a set number of taught courses plus a dissertation or project. AMBA accreditation requires "the equivalent of at least 1,800 hours of learning effort", the same as a standard UK master's degree.

== North America ==
=== United States ===
==== Programs ====
Full-time MBA programs normally take place over two academic years (i.e. approximately 18 months of term time). For example, in the Northern Hemisphere, they often begin in late August or early September of year one and continue until May or June of year two, with a three to four-month summer break in between years one and two. Students enter with a reasonable amount of prior real-world work experience and take classes during weekdays like other university students. A typical full-time, accelerated, part-time, or modular MBA requires 60 credits (600 class hours) of graduate work.

Accelerated MBA programs are a variation of the two-year programs. They involve a higher course load with more intense class and examination schedules and are usually condensed into one year. They usually have less downtime during the program and between semesters. For example, there is no three to four-month summer break, and between semesters there might be seven to ten days off rather than three to five weeks vacation. Accelerated programs typically have a lower cost than full-time two-year programs.

Part-time MBA programs normally hold classes on weekday evenings after normal working hours, or on weekends. Part-time programs normally last three years or more. The students in these programs typically consist of working professionals, who take a light course load for a longer period of time until the graduation requirements are met.

Evening (second shift) MBA programs are full-time programs that normally hold classes on weekday evenings, after normal working hours, or on weekends for a duration of two years. The students in these programs typically consist of working professionals, who can not leave their work to pursue a full-time regular shift MBA. Most second shift programs are offered at universities in India.

Modular MBA programs are similar to part-time programs, although typically employing a lock-step curriculum with classes packaged together in blocks lasting from one to three weeks.

Executive (part-time) MBA (EMBA) programs developed to meet the educational needs of managers and executives, allowing students to earn an MBA (or another business-related graduate degree) in two years or less while working full-time. Participants come from every type and size of organization – profit, nonprofit, government – representing a variety of industries. EMBA students typically have a higher level of work experience, often 10 years or more, compared to other MBA students. In response to the increasing number of EMBA programs offered, The Executive MBA Council was formed in 1981 to advance executive education.

Full-time executive MBA programs are a new category of full-time one year MBA programs aimed at professionals with approximately five years or more. They are primarily offered in countries like India where the two-year MBA program is targeted at fresh graduates with no experience or minimal experience. These full-time executive MBA programs are similar to one year MBA programs offered by schools like Insead and IMD.

Distance learning MBA programs hold classes off-campus. These programs can be offered in a number of different formats: correspondence courses by postal mail or email, non-interactive broadcast video, pre-recorded video, live teleconference or videoconference, offline or online computer courses. Many schools offer these programs.

Blended learning programs combine distance learning with face-to-face instruction. These programs typically target working professionals who are unable to attend traditional part-time programs.

MBA dual degree programs combine an MBA with others (such as an MS, MA, MEng, or a JD, etc.) to let students cut costs (dual programs usually cost less than pursuing two degrees separately), save time on education and to tailor the business education courses to their needs. This is generally achieved by allowing core courses of one program to count as electives in the other. Some business schools offer programs in which students can earn both a bachelor's degree in business administration and an MBA in five years.

Mini-MBA is a term used by many non-profit and for-profit institutions to describe a training regimen focused on the fundamentals of business. In the past, Mini-MBA programs have typically been offered as non-credit bearing courses that require less than 100 hours of total learning. However, due to the criticisms of these certificates, many schools have now shifted their programs to offer courses for full credit so that they may be applied towards a complete traditional MBA degree. This is to allow students to verify business-related coursework for employment purposes and still allow the option to complete a full-time MBA degree program at a later period if they elect to do so.

==== Admissions criteria ====
Many programs base their admission decisions on a combination of undergraduate grade point average, academic transcripts, entrance exam scores (for example, the GMAT or the GRE test score), a résumé containing significant work experience, essays, letters of recommendation, group discussions, and personal interviews. Some schools are also interested in extracurricular activities, community service activities, or volunteer work and how the student can improve the school's diversity and contribute to the student body as a whole.

The Graduate Management Admission Test (GMAT) is the most prominently used entrance exam for admissions into MBA programs. The Graduate Record Examination (GRE) is also accepted by almost all MBA programs in order to fulfill any entrance exam requirement they may have. Some schools do not weigh entrance exam scores as heavily as other criteria, and some programs do not require entrance exam scores for admission. In order to achieve a diverse class, business schools also consider the target male-female ratio and local-international student ratios. In rare cases, some MBA degrees do not require students to have an undergraduate degree and will accept significant management experience in lieu of an undergraduate degree. In the UK, for example, a Higher National Diploma (HND) or even Higher National Certificate (HNC) is acceptable in some programs.

Depending on the program, type and duration of work experience can be a critical admissions component for many MBA programs. Many top-tier programs require five or more years of work experience for admission.

MBA admissions consulting services have been increasingly used by prospective MBA applicants to improve their chances of admission. They are most common in the U.S., with as many as one-quarter of applicants using these services in 2016, though they have been gaining popularity elsewhere, including India and Canada. Consultants can provide basic coaching including help with program selection, mock interviews, and essay proofreading, though some will provide other services like writing essays from scratch. The use of consulting services is frowned upon by many business schools' admissions committees, and applications can be hurt by looking like they were written with a consultant, such as by having a high level of writing compared to the candidate's speech or not appearing unique. Some also express concern that they give an unfair advantage to students who can afford the services' high costs.

==== Content ====
In general, MBA programs are structured around core courses – an essentially standard curriculum – and elective courses that may allow for a subject specialty or concentration. Thus, in the program's first year (or part), students acquire both a working knowledge of management functions and the analytical skills required for these, while in the second year (part), students pursue elective courses, which may count towards a specialization. (Topics in business ethics may be included at the generalist or specialist level.) After the first year, many full-time students seek internships. The degree culminates with coursework in business strategy, the program capstone. A dissertation or major project is usually a degree requirement after the completion of coursework. Many MBA programs end with a comprehensive exit examination; see below.

For Executive MBA programs, the core curriculum is generally similar, but may seek to leverage the strengths associated with the more seasoned and professional profile of the student body, emphasizing leadership, and drawing more from the specific experience of the individual students.

Programs are designed such that students gain exposure to theory and practice alike. Courses include lectures, case studies, and team projects; the mix though, will differ by school and by format. Theory is covered in the classroom setting by academic faculty, and is reinforced through the case method, placing the student in the role of the decision maker. Similar to real world business situations, cases include both constraints and incomplete information. Practical learning (field immersion) often comprises consulting projects with real clients, and is generally undertaken in teams (or "syndicates"). The practical elements (as well as the case studies) often involve external practitioners – sometimes business executives – supporting the teaching from academic faculty. (See Business school § Case studies and § Other approaches; and, generally, Business education § Postgraduate education.)

MBA Course Structure
Core
Core	Analytical	Accounting, economics for management, organizational behavior, quantitative analysis (operations research and business statistics).
Core	Functional	Financial management, human resource management, marketing management, operations management.
Core	Ethics	Business ethics, corporate social responsibility, corporate governance.
Electives	Common broad electives include: entrepreneurship, international business, management information systems, business law, market research, organizational design, negotiations, international finance, project management, managing non-profits and real estate investing. Additionally, many other elective options of a more specialized nature are offered by various institutions.	
Capstone	Strategy	Strategic management and business leadership.
Capstone	Research	Research methodology and dissertation / major project.

Common MBA Specializations/Concentrations
Accounting, entrepreneurship, finance (including corporate finance and investment management), international business, healthcare administration, human resources, management information systems, management science, marketing, operations management, organizational design, project management, real estate, risk management and strategy, among others.

As outlined, courses begin with underlying topics and then progress to more advanced functional topics where these are applied; see aside.

The analytic skills required for management are usually covered initially. The accounting course(s) may treat financial and management accounting separately or in one hybrid course. Financial accounting deals mainly in the interpretation (and preparation) of financial statements while management accounting deals mainly in the analysis of internal results. The economics course covers managerial economics, a technical course that mainly focuses on product pricing as influenced by microeconomic theory, and aggregate-or macroeconomics, which deals with topics like the banking system, the money supply, and inflation. Operations Research and statistics are sometimes combined as "Managerial Decision-Making" or "Quantitative Decision-Making"; organizational behavior and human resource management may similarly be combined. In many programs, applicants with appropriate background may be exempt from various analytical courses.

With these as underpin, the course then covers the core management functions, and, in turn, allows students to select from further advanced topics as appropriate. Some programs treat the curricula here in two parts: the first course provides an overview, while the second revisits the subject in-depth (perhaps as specializations); alternatively, the first addresses short-term, tactical problems, while the second addresses long-term, strategic problems (e.g., "Financial Management I" might cover working capital management, while part II covers capital investment decisions). An Information systems / technology course is increasingly included as a core functional course rather than an elective. Ethics training is often delivered with coursework in corporate social responsibility and corporate governance. Note that – generally – courses here, although technical in scope, are, ultimately, oriented toward corporate management. (For example, the principal finance course may cover the technicalities of financial instrument valuation and capital raising, but does so from the perspective of managerial finance, as opposed to investment banking.) Technically-oriented courses, if offered, will be via a specialization.

Programs may also include coursework-based training in the skills needed at senior levels of management: soft skills, such as (general) leadership and negotiation; hard skills, such as spreadsheets and project management; thinking skills such as innovation and creativity. Training in areas such as multiculturalism and corporate social responsibility is similarly included. Company visits (including overseas travel), and guest lectures or seminars with CEOs and management personalities may also be included. These, with the core subjects, provide the graduate with breadth, while the specialty courses provide depth.

For the business strategy component, the degree capstone, the focus is on finding competitive advantage and the long-term positioning and management of the entity as a whole. Here, the key functional areas are thus synthesized to an overall view; the strategy course depicts how the various sub-disciplines integrate to tell one continuous story, with each discipline complementing the others. Corresponding training in business leadership may also be scheduled and participation in a business simulation or game is also a common degree requirement. "Strategy" may be offered as a sequence of courses, beginning in the first part (formulation) and culminating in the second (execution), or as a single intensive course, offered during the second part. Some programs offer a specialization in "strategy", others in management consulting which substantially addresses the same issues.

The MBA dissertation (or thesis in some universities) will, in general, comprise the following in some combination: a discussion of the literature, providing a critical review and structuring of what is known on a given topic, to address a specific problem; a case study that goes beyond simple description, containing the analysis of hitherto unpublished material; a test of the application or limitations of some known principle or technique in a particular situation, and/or suggested modifications.

As an alternative to the dissertation, some programs instead allow for a major project. Here (part-time) students will address a problem current in their organization; particularly in programs with an action learning orientation, these may be practically oriented. Most MBA programs require additional course work in research methodology, preceding the dissertation or project. Some programs allow that the research component as a whole may be substituted with additional elective coursework.

===== Exit examination =====
Many MBA programs culminate in a comprehensive exit examination. The national standardized exam known as the Major Field Test for MBAs (MFT-MBA) has been administered in the MBA programs of over 300 U.S. universities. The MFT-MBA aims to assess skills, knowledge, and reasoning ability within the domain of standard MBA curriculum. It is administered by Educational Testing Service. Another prominent option for comprehensive exit exams is the Common Professional Component Comprehensive Exam for MBAs (CPC COMP Exam for MBAs) owned by Peregrine Academic Services. Many programs choose to administer their own in-house exam rather than a standardized test.

==== Honor societies ====
Honor societies recognize individuals for high achievement in MBA programs. These honor societies include:

- Beta Gamma Sigma – membership requires one to be in the top 20% of their program's class after completing half of the program.
- Delta Mu Delta – membership requires one to be in the top 20% of their program's class and have a GPA of at least 3.6 after completing half of the program.
- Financial Management Association – membership requires one to have a 3.5 overall GPA, or a 3.5 GPA in finance and finance-related courses, after completing half of the program.
- T10 – membership requires one to have scored in the top 10% in the country on a national comprehensive MBA exam.

==== Careers ====
An MBA prepares individuals for many types of careers. According to a survey by the Graduate Management Admissions Council, 64% of year 2012 MBA graduates used their MBA to change careers. Some of the more common jobs an MBA prepares one for include:

- Business analyst or strategist
- Business development analyst, associate, or manager
- Market research analyst
- Managing Director (of a department)
- Investment banker
- Entrepreneur/founder
- Financial analyst, associate, or manager
- Management consultant
- Marketing associate, analyst, or manager
- Portfolio manager
- Healthcare administrator, analyst, or manager
- Project analyst or strategist
- Product analyst, associate, or manager
- Program analyst, associate, or manager
- Operations analyst, associate, or manager

== Oceania ==
=== Australia ===
In Australia, 42 Australian business schools offer the MBA degree (16 are AACSB, AMBA or EQUIS accredited). Universities differentiate themselves by gaining international accreditation and focusing on national and international rankings. Most MBAs are one to two years full-time. There is little use of GMAT, and instead, each educational institution specifies its own requirements, which normally entails several years of management-level work experience as well as proven academic skills.

Graduate Management Association of Australia carries out ratings for Australian MBAs and annually publishes Australian MBA Star Ratings. The Financial Review Boss carries out biennial rankings of Australian MBAs.

=== New Zealand ===
In New Zealand, most universities offer MBA classes, typically through part-time arrangement or evening classes. Only two universities offer full-time programs to international students, the University of Otago (Otago MBA) and Auckland University of Technology (AUT). The Otago MBA is the longer established of the two, offering a 240 points program while AUT MBA is a 180-point program.

== Program rankings ==
Since 1967, publications have ranked MBA programs using various methods. The Gourman Report (1967–1997) did not disclose criteria or ranking methods, and these reports were criticized for reporting statistically impossible data, such as no ties among schools, narrow gaps in scores with no variation in gap widths, and ranks of nonexistent departments. In 1977 The Carter Report ranked MBA programs based on the number of academic articles published by faculty, the Ladd & Lipset Survey ranked business schools based on faculty surveys, and MBA Magazine ranked schools based on votes cast by business school deans.

Today, publications by the Aspen Institute, Business Week, The Economist, Financial Times, Forbes, Quacquarelli Symonds, U.S. News & World Report, and the Wall Street Journal make their own rankings of MBA programs. Schools' ranks can vary across publications, as the methodologies for rankings differ among publications:

- The Aspen Institute publishes the Beyond Grey Pinstripes rankings which are based on the integration of social and environmental stewardship into university curriculum and faculty research. Rankings from a small sample of well-known schools are calculated on the amount of sustainability coursework made available to students (20%), amount of student exposure to relevant material (25%), amount of coursework focused on stewardship by for-profit corporations (30%), and relevant faculty research (25%). The 2011 survey and ranking include data from 150 universities.
- Business Week's rankings are based on student surveys, a survey of corporate recruiters, and an intellectual capital rating.
- The Economist Intelligence Unit, published in The Economist, surveys both business schools (80%) and students and recent graduates (20%). Ranking criteria include GMAT scores, employment and salary statistics, class options, and student body demographics. The Economist withdrew from the MBA rankings business after releasing its 2022 ranking.
- Financial Times uses survey responses from alumni who graduated three years prior to the ranking and information from business schools. Salary and employment statistics are weighted heavily.
- Forbes considers only the return of investment five years after graduation. MBA alumni are asked about their salary, the tuition fees of their MBA program, and other direct costs as well as opportunity costs involved. Based on this data, a final "5-year gain" is calculated and determines the MBA ranking position.
- Quacquarelli Symonds QS Global 200 Business Schools Report compiles regional rankings of business schools around the world. Ranks are calculated using a two-year moving average of points assigned by employers who hire MBA graduates.
- U.S. News & World Report incorporates responses from deans, program directors, and senior faculty about the academic quality of their programs as well as the opinions of hiring professionals. The ranking is calculated through a weighted formula of quality assessment (40%), placement success (35%), and student selectivity (25%).
- UT-Dallas Top 100 Business School Research Rankings ranks business schools on the research faculty publish, similar to The Carter Report of the past.
- The Wall Street Journal, which stopped ranking full-time MBA programs in 2007, based its rankings on skill and behavioral development that may predict career success, such as social skills, teamwork orientation, ethics, and analytic and problem-solving abilities.

The ranking of MBA programs has been discussed in articles and on academic websites. Critics of ranking methodologies maintain that any published rankings should be viewed with caution for the following reasons:

- Rankings exhibit intentional selection bias as they limit the surveyed population to a small number of MBA programs and ignore the majority of schools, many with excellent offerings.
- Ranking methods may be subject to personal biases and statistically flawed methodologies (especially methods relying on subjective interviews of hiring managers, students, or faculty).
- Rankings use no objective measures of program quality.
- The same list of schools appears in each ranking with some variation in ranks, so a school ranked as number 1 in one list may be number 17 in another list.
- Rankings tend to concentrate on representing MBA schools themselves, but some schools offer MBA programs of different qualities and yet the ranking will only rely upon information from the full-time program (e.g., a school may use highly reputable faculty to teach a daytime program, but use adjunct faculty in its evening program or have drastically lower admissions criteria for its evening program than for its daytime program).
- A high rank in a national publication tends to become a self-fulfilling prophecy.
- Some leading business schools including Harvard, INSEAD, Wharton and Sloan provide limited cooperation with certain ranking publications due to their perception that rankings are misused.

One study found that ranking MBA programs by a combination of graduates' starting salaries and average student GMAT score can approximately duplicate the top 20 list of the national publications, and concluded that a truly objective ranking would use objective measures of program quality and be individualized to the needs of each prospective student. National publications have recognized the value of rankings against different criteria and now offer lists ranked different ways: by salary, GMAT score of students, selectivity, and so forth. While useful, these rankings have yet to meet the critique that rankings are not tailored to individual needs, that they use an incomplete population of schools, may fail to distinguish between the different MBA program types offered by each school, or rely on subjective interviews.

== Criticism ==
Articles have been written about public perceptions of the crisis, ranging from schools' acknowledgment of issues with the training students receive to criticisms of the MBA's role in society. After the Great Recession, the media raised questions about the value and content of business school programs. Prior to the 2008 financial crisis, graduates had reportedly tended to go into finance after receiving their degrees. As financial professionals are widely seen as responsible for the global economic meltdown, anecdotal evidence suggests new graduates are choosing different career paths. Deans at top business schools have also acknowledged that media and public perception of the MBA degree shifted as a result of the Great Recession.

== See also ==
- List of business journals

=== Related graduate business degrees ===
- Master of Accountancy (MAcc or MAcy) / Master of Professional Accountancy (MPA, or MPAcc), a postgraduate degree in accounting
- Master of Business Communication (MBC)
- Master of Commerce (MCom or MComm), a postgraduate business degree usually focused on a particular area
- Master of Economics (M.Econ./M.Ec.)
- Master of Enterprise (MEnt), a postgraduate, technology & enterprise-based qualification
- Master of Bioscience Enterprise (MBioEnt), a postgraduate degree focused on the commercialization of biotechnology
- Master of Finance (MFin), a postgraduate degree in finance
- Master of Health Administration (MHA), a postgraduate health administration degree
- Master of International Business (MIB), a postgraduate degree focused on International Business
- Master of Management (MM), a postgraduate business degree
- Master of Science in Management (MSM), a postgraduate business management degree
- Master of Marketing Research (MMR) a postgraduate degree focusing on research in the field of marketing
- Master of Nonprofit Organizations (MNO or MNPO), the postgraduate degree for philanthropy and voluntary sector professionals
- Master of Public Administration (MPA), a postgraduate public administration degree
- Master of Social Science (MSS), a postgraduate degree
- Master of Project Management (MSPM or MPM), a postgraduate project management degree
- Masters of Management: Co-operatives and Credit Unions, a post-graduate degree for co-operative and credit union managers
- Master in Sustainable Business (MSB)
- Master of Real Estate (MScRE), a postgraduate degree focusing on real estate.
- Master of Information Management (MIM), a postgraduate degree focusing on information management.

==== Executive ====
- Executive Master of Science in Business Administration (Executive MScBA), a postgraduate degree focusing advanced-level conceptual foundation in a student's chosen field such as operational excellence in the biotech/pharma industry.

==== Doctoral ====
- Doctor of Business Administration (DBA), a doctorate in business administration
- Doctor of Management (D.M.)
- PhD in Management (PhD), a business doctoral degree
- D.Phil in Management (D.Phil), a doctorate in business
- Engineering Doctorate (EngD), A professional doctorate in the UK involving a management thesis and taught MBA courses

=== Other ===
- Bachelor of Business Administration
- MBA Games
- Outline of business management
