= Master of Management: Co-operatives and Credit Unions =

The Master of Management: Co-operatives and Credit Unions (MMCCU) is a master's degree in co-operative and credit union administration. The degree is currently offered solely through an international program at the Sobey School of Business at Saint Mary's University in Halifax, Nova Scotia. The program is designed for students entering business management and degree applicants come from diverse academic disciplines.

The MMCCU degree is designed to improve students' understanding of management within the context of the co-operative economic model. Similar to the more traditional MBA, students are introduced to economics, accounting, human resources, marketing, technology, best practices and equity management. The MMCCU also teaches the history and philosophy of the co-operative management model and hosts international symposia.

While the coursework is delivered exclusively on-line, participants proceed as cohorts and meet in person three times during the process: once for Orientation Week in Halifax, once for a field trip in the second year and finally for Convocation upon completion.

== Background ==
The MMCCU degree program was created in 2002 by a partnership between Saint Mary's University and the Co-operative Management Education Co-operative (CMEC), a federation of over 50 cooperatives. This co-operative consists of co-operatives, individuals, as well as educational and support institutions. Members donated nearly $1 million to fund the program and the curriculum was approved by the Maritime Provinces' Higher Education Commission. The program was founded by Saint Mary's University Professor John Chamard and took its first students in 2003. The first cohort graduated in 2007. While other methods of training in co-operatives exist,^{1} the MMCCU is the only English-language master's degree in co-operative management by a business school that is internationally accredited. The Sobey School of Business, the home of the MMCCU, has accreditation through the Association to Advance Collegiate Schools of Business (AACSB).

=== Method of delivery ===
The MMCCU is an on-line only program using the Blackboard Learning System virtual environment. With the exception of the orientation and field trip, the classes only meet on-line. Students move through the program as a cohort, so once a student starts they must commit to the entire program or drop-out.

== Program content ==
The Cooperative Principles are central to MMCCU curriculum.

== Reception ==
A survey of co-operative managers who completed the degree found that while they were satisfied with the program, only 40% of respondents were able to implement ideas they learned in their workplaces.

== Notes ==
CooperationWorks! trains cooperative developers in the United States. The University of Toronto offers an undergraduate program in co-operatives, the University of Wisconsin offers a survey course on co-operatives, and the University of Massachusetts offers an undergraduate certificate in applied economic research on cooperatives.
