= List of Dominicans =

List of Dominicans may refer to:

- List of people from the Dominican Republic
- List of people from Dominica
- List of people of the Dominican Order
- List of Dominican Americans
