= Master of Business Communication =

The Master of Business Communication (MBC) is a specialized academic degree typically conferred by a business school. The degree incorporates many elements of the Master of Business Administration MBA degree with a specialized focus on corporate communications, public relations and marketing communications.

The degree typically requires three years of full-time study but may take longer when undertaken on a part-time basis. It is evident that some institutions are offering the degree in similar structure to the MBA. The aim of the program is to educate on the interdisciplinary principles of business management as they apply to the corporate communicator.
