= Saint Mary's University (Halifax) =

University in Halifax, Canada

Coordinates: 44°37′54.07″N 63°34′47.09″W

- Motto: Age Quod Agis (Latin)
- Motto in English: "What You Do, Do Well"
- Type: Public
- Established: 1802; 224 years ago
- Academic affiliations: AUCC, IAU, UArctic, ACU, CUSID, CBIE
- Endowment: $53.7 million (2021)
- Chancellor: Michael Durland
- President: Michael Khan
- Vice-president: Shannon Dea; Susan MacDonald; Erin Sargeant Greenwood
- Visitor: Brian Joseph Dunn
- Academic staff: 501 (2014)
- Administrative staff: 484 (2014)
- Students: 5,178 (Fall 2026)
- Undergraduates: 4,570
- Postgraduates: 608
- Location: 923 Robie Street, Halifax, Nova Scotia, Canada
- Campus: Urban, 32 ha (79 acres)
- Tagline: World Without Limits
- Colours: Maroon and Burgundy
- Nickname: Huskies
- Sporting affiliations: U Sports, AUS
- Mascot: Husky
- Website: smu.ca

Saint Mary's University (SMU) is a public university located in Halifax, Nova Scotia, Canada. The school is best known for having nationally leading programs in business and chemistry. The campus is situated in Halifax's South End and covers approximately 32 hectares (79 acres).

== History ==
=== Founding ===
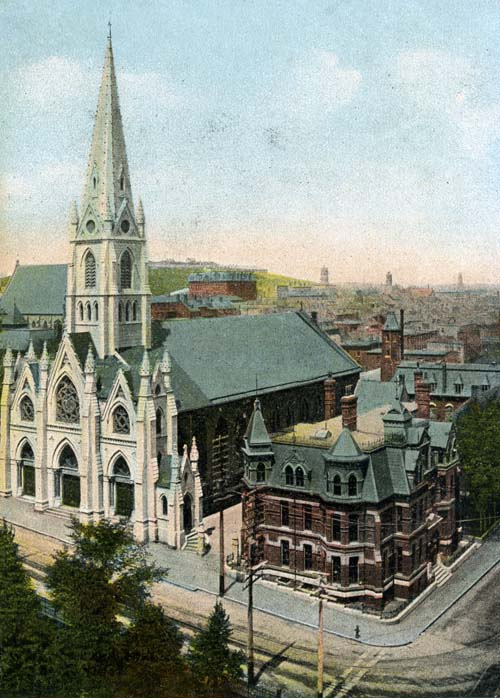
Saint Mary's was established in Glebe House (the brick building on the right).

Saint Mary's is the second-oldest English-speaking and first Roman Catholic-initiated university in Canada. The Roman Catholic church founded Saint Mary's College in Halifax, Nova Scotia in 1802. It was established in Glebe House, on the corner of Spring Garden Road and Barrington Street, with the aim of extending educational opportunities for Catholic youth and training candidates for the clergy.

In 1840, the Nova Scotia Legislature bestowed the degree granting charter to Saint Mary's and eleven years later granted the university formal legal status. Saint Mary's collapsed in 1883, but was revived in 1903 by Cornelius O'Brien, then Archbishop of Halifax. It reopened as a high school in a new campus on Windsor Street, near the junction with Quinpool Road.

In 1913 the Christian Brothers of Ireland were asked by the Archdiocese of Halifax to direct the college and academic programs. Degree-granting resumed in 1918. With this change of leadership the university's reputation thrived as a liberal arts institution and expanded its undergraduate programs, with the most notable being the Faculty of Commerce in 1934 (now known as the Sobey School of Business), which was the first of its kind in Canada. In 1940 the Upper Province of the Society of Jesus (the Jesuits) was invited to succeed the Christian Brothers as both administrators and faculty. A Roll of Honour at Saint Mary's University is dedicated to students of Saint Mary's College who volunteered for the Second World War.

=== Expansion ===
Due to rapid growth the college was fast outgrowing the Windsor Street campus, and so the Gorsebrook Golf Club was purchased in 1943. Construction of the new campus was delayed by wartime steel shortages. The relocation was completed in 1952. The former college building was rented by the Halifax school board and the overcrowded Saint Patrick's Boys' School was relocated there. The modern Saint Patrick's High School opened on the site in 1954 and operated until 2007. The old Saint Mary's College building was rented for a time by the Maritime Conservatory of Music before it was sold to the city in 1968 and demolished to make way for the expansion of Saint Patrick's.

The next 30 years would see the university flourish under Jesuit supervision, with such advancements as the formal recognition of the "college" as a university in 1952 and purchasing the first computer in Atlantic Canada (a Royal McBee LGP-30) in 1959. In 1970 the Jesuits formally incorporated the university under the "Acts of Incorporation" which gave all administrative and academic duties to the Board of Governors and Academic Senate, making Saint Mary's a secular institution. Saint Mary's University was established by the Saint Mary's University Act, 1970.

=== High school ===
In 1951, the High School moved with Saint Mary's College to the Robie Street campus where they occupied three classrooms on the second floor of the new McNally building. The High School offered an embellished junior matriculation for grades 9,10,11 and many of the boys entered Saint Mary's directly upon graduation although some went to Saint Patrick's or Queen Elizabeth to attend grade 12. The Jesuit influence, which incorporated the principles of a sound mind and a sound body, meant that everyone who attended the high school became an active participant in intramural hockey, football, and basketball.

The Saint Mary's University High School closed in 1963. A plaque detailing the history of the high school was placed at the entrance to the McNally building in 1988 as part of a Twenty Five year reunion.

=== Modern history ===
Since then the university has continued expansion of its academic programs with the most notable being the offerings of doctoral level studies in astronomy and business and the accreditation of the business school with the AACSB (Association to Advance Collegiate Schools of Business). At the same time the university has expanded its campus facilities with noted additions of the Burke–Gaffney Observatory in the 1970s and the Sobey Building in 1998. In 1992, the Faculty of Commerce was renamed the Sobey School of Business, after Frank H. Sobey, founder of Sobeys. In 2001, SMU's Huskies were the first Atlantic Canadian university team to advance to the world finals in the ACM International Collegiate Programming Contest World Finals.

In early 1994 workers renovating the Rice Residence found that an exterior wall on the 16th storey was dangerously unstable and posed a hazard to those walking below. Over 250 students were moved to the Halifax Hilton, which had recently gone out of business, which was used as a temporary residence while repairs were carried out.

In the 1990s the provincial government sought to cut funding to Nova Scotia's universities. Teacher education programs were consolidated at Mount Saint Vincent University, Acadia University, and Université Sainte-Anne, while the education faculties at Saint Mary's and Dalhousie were wound up and the 140-year-old Nova Scotia Teachers College was closed altogether. The Saint Mary's education program ended in the spring of 1996. It was not forcibly closed by the province, but the minister of education stated that he would only licence teachers who had graduated from the three approved universities.

In 2013 the Saint Mary's High School basketball achievement was recognized at the Hall of Fame events and a plaque containing the names of all of the players who represented the school on the 1959–1962. The plaque can be seen in the Tower at Saint Mary's University.

== Faculties ==
Saint Mary's comprises four faculties:

- Arts
  - Dean: Dr. Mary I. Ingraham
- Sobey School of Business
  - Dean: Dr. Michel Delorme
- Science
  - Dean: Dr. Sam Veres
- Graduate Studies and Research
  - Dean: Dr. Adam Sarty

== Campus ==
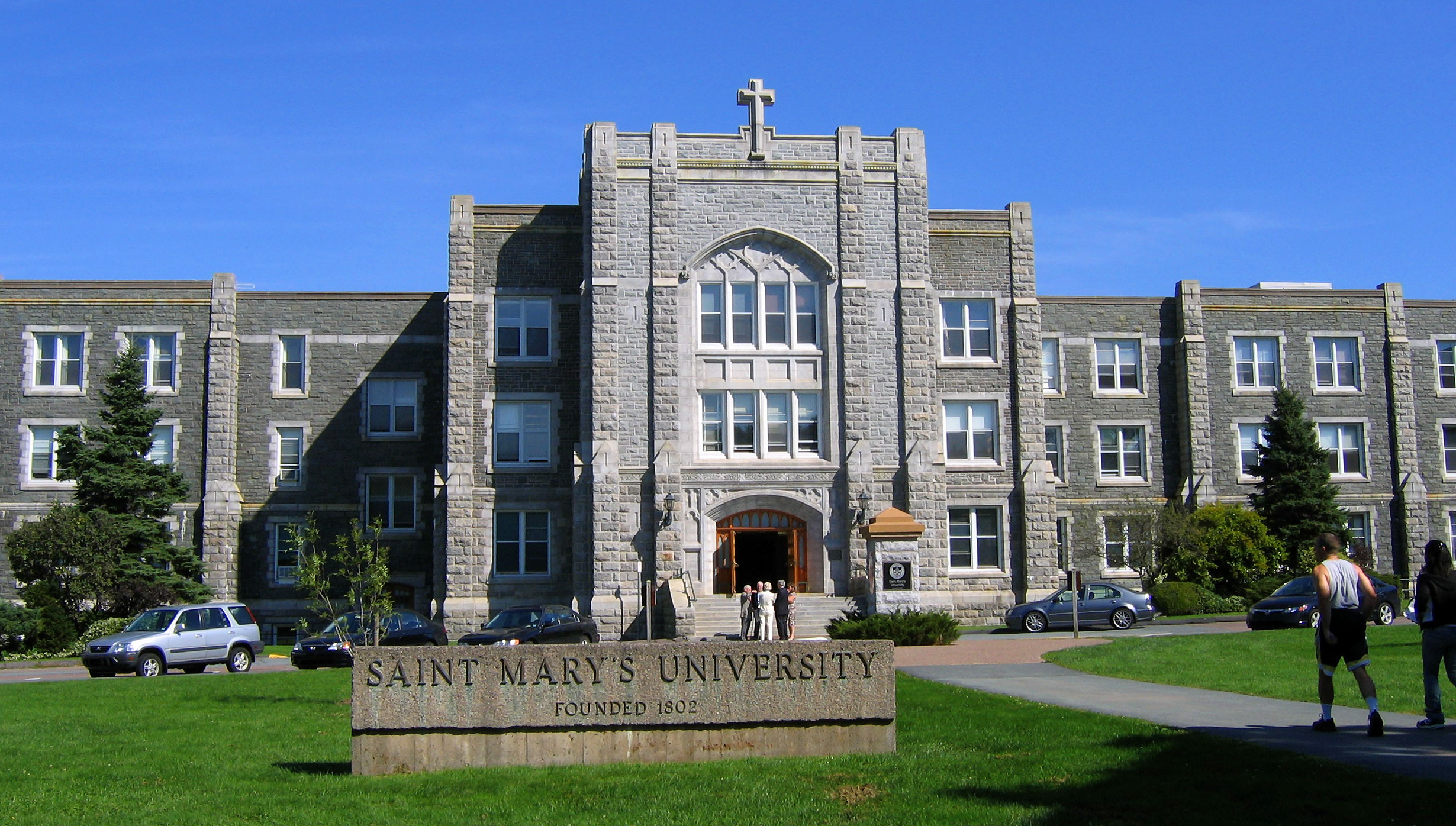
McNally Building

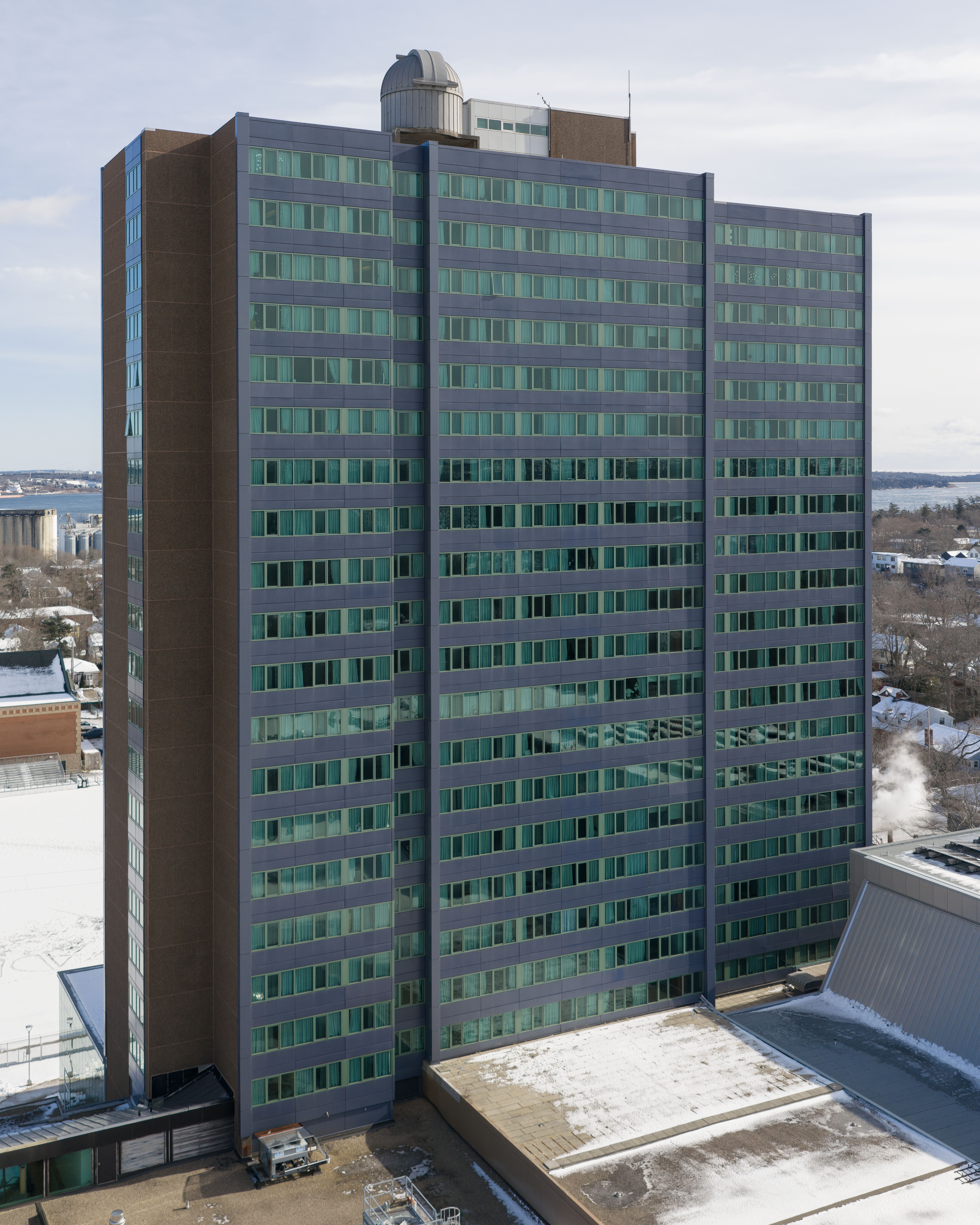
Loyola Residence

The Saint Mary's 80-acre (32 hectare) campus is located in the south end, not far from Downtown Halifax and just down the road from Dalhousie University. Major buildings include:

- McNally Building (1951)
- Burke Building (1965)
- Alumni Arena (1965)
- O'Donnell-Hennessey Student Centre (1967–69)
- Science Building (1968)
- Rice Residence (1968)
- Vanier Residence (1968)
- Huskies Stadium (1969)
- Loyola Complex (1971)
- Patrick Power Library (1976)
- The Tower (1987) – merged into Homburg Centre
- Sobey Building (1997)
- The Atrium (2009)
- Homburg Centre (2012)
- 960 Tower Road (2013)
- The Dauphinee Centre (2019)
- Sobeys Inspiration Hub (2023)
- The Exchange (2024)

Over the past decade many of the older buildings on campus have been substantially renovated. In March 2005, Saint Mary's started the "Science Building Renewal Project" which was estimated to cost $100 million. This project is part of the larger project the “University’s Strategic Directions and Academic Plan” which was developed in consultation with students, faculty and local citizens in order to meet both the needs of the university and local community over the next decade. The project focused on modernising and expanding the science faculty's resources, generally renewing the architectural, mechanical and electrical infrastructures of the Science Building, providing additional office and research space to faculty members, improving lab layout, and integrating with future campus developments.

The university completed construction of the Atrium and Global Commons project in late 2009. The three-storey $17.5 million complex links the Science Centre, the Burke Building and the Patrick Power Library. The space features a common area, theatre style classrooms, offices and study spaces. The project also features advanced green environmental technologies, has fully integrated hard and Wi-Fi systems, a food outlet and a three-storey green wall.

The 62-year-old McNally Building recently underwent a $27 million renewal thanks in large part to the Canadian governments Infrastructure Renewal Programme. Most of the interior of the four floor, four wing complex was rebuilt.

Construction of the new Homburg Centre for Health and Wellness began in October 2010. This complex, an extension of the Tower Fitness Centre, houses new space for community health and wellness activities and is the new home for the Centre for the Study of Sport and Health. The $8 million project was funded by a donation from real estate developer and manager Richard Homburg and the university's capital campaign. It opened in 2012.

960 Tower Road, a three-storey, 28,000 square foot building, opened in 2013. It is home to the English as a second language program as well as the Sobey School Business Development Centre, which moved back to campus from a downtown location. The university stirred controversy when it demolished the former Halifax Infants’ Home in 2014.

SMU's new Dauphinee Centre ice arena sits on the site of the 54 year old Alumni Arena. Made possible through generous donations from the estate of the late alumni Bob Dauphinee and SMU parents Glen and Nancy Holmes. The Dauphinee Centre is connected to the Homburg Centre for Health and Wellness, by a pedway and features an NHL regulation ice surface, heated viewing gallery, community meeting rooms, canteen facilities and capacity of 1200 fans.

In October 2023, Saint Mary’s opened the Sobeys Inspiration Hub, a four-storey, 43,000-square-foot building dedicated to supporting entrepreneurship and innovation at the university.

== Arctic research ==
Saint Mary's University is an active member of the University of the Arctic. UArctic is an international cooperative network based in the Circumpolar Arctic region, consisting of more than 200 universities, colleges, and other organizations with an interest in promoting education and research in the Arctic region.

The university participates in UArctic’s mobility program north2north. The aim of that program is to enable students of member institutions to study in different parts of the North.

== Legacy ==
The Saint Mary's University mace shows the religious background of this now secular institution. There are crests for the Archdiocese of Halifax, the LaSalle Christian Brothers, the Irish Christian Brothers, and the Jesuits.

On 27 May 2002, Canada Post issued "Saint Mary's University, 1802–2002" as part of the Canadian Universities series, based upon a design by Steven Slipp, based on photographs by James Steeves and on an illustration by Bonnie Ross. The 48¢ stamps are perforated 13.5 and were printed by Ashton-Potter Canada Limited.

In June 2021, Saint Mary's University announced a rebranding of its logo, backgrounds and tag lines.

== Reputation ==
University rankings

World rankings

Canadian rankings
- Maclean's Undergraduate: 4
- Maclean's Reputation: 39

The annual Maclean's rankings evaluate universities on 13 performance measures. Maclean's evaluates universities in three categories, with Saint Mary's being ranked amongst other universities the publication categorized as "primarily undergraduate" institutions. In Maclean's 2023 rankings, Saint Mary's was ranked third amongst 19 "primarily undergraduate" universities in Canada.

The Canadian University Report is conducted annually by The Globe and Mail, and reflects the opinions of more than 33,000 undergraduate students across the country as gathered in a student satisfaction survey. Saint Mary's University is in the "small" category of along with 15 other universities with enrolment between 4,000 and 12,000 students.

The Canadian University Report stated that overall student satisfaction had a grade of B+ in 2013, the same as in 2012, A− in quality of teaching, A− in class size, A− in buildings and facilities and improvement shown in six key categories.

== Notable alumni ==
- Alan Abraham, former Lieutenant Governor of Nova Scotia
- Brian Ahern, producer for Anne Murray, Emmylou Harris, Johnny Cash
- Steve Armitage, CBC Sportscaster
- John William Ashe, President of the United Nations General Assembly, 68th session and former ambassador to the United Nations for Antigua and Barbuda.
- Jackie Barrett, Special Olympics Powerlifter, amassed 15 Powerlifting medals at four Special Olympics World Games appearances
- Micah Brown, United States national American football team and international football player
- Signa Butler, CBC Sports host and play-by-play commentator
- Noah Cantor, Canadian Football League player
- Karen Casey, Nova Scotia MLA for Colchester North
- Kori Cheverie, the first female full-time assistant coach in Canadian Interuniversity Sport men's hockey history.
- Zach Churchill, Nova Scotia MLA for Yarmouth
- Louis Comeau, member of Parliament, entrepreneur and former CEO of Nova Scotia Power
- Patrick H. Curran, former Chief Judge of the Provincial Court of Nova Scotia
- Chris d'Entremont Nova Scotia MLA for Argyle
- Mal Davis, former National Hockey League player
- Terry Donahoe, former leader of the Nova Scotia Progressive Conservative Party
- Miguel Figueroa, political activist, former leader of the Communist Party of Canada and of the Figueroa v Canada case.
- Chris Flynn, Canadian Football Hall of Famer, 3 time Hec Crighton Trophy winner
- Mayann Francis, former Lieutenant Governor of Nova Scotia – first African Nova Scotian to hold title; author
- Wayne Gaudet, Nova Scotia MLA for Clare
- Glenn Graham, Celtic musician
- Paul Hollingsworth, CTV Atlantic newscaster and TSN reporter
- Tim Houston, 30th Premier of Nova Scotia
- Don Johnson, president of the Canadian Amateur Hockey Association and former hockey player and coach with Saint Mary's
- Andy Jones, comedian
- Peter J. Kelly, former mayor of Halifax, Nova Scotia
- Rachel Reid (author), Canadian Author
- Robert P. Kelly, former CEO of the Bank of New York Mellon
- Terry Kelly, CM, blind musician
- Joseph Phillip Kennedy, Chief Justice of the Supreme Court of Nova Scotia
- Becky Kent, Nova Scotia MLA for Cole Harbour – Eastern Passage
- Steven Laffoley, educator and author of creative nonfiction and fiction
- Nicole Lundrigan, novelist
- John MacDonell, Nova Scotia MLA for Hants East
- Jasmine R. Marcelin, physician
- Terry Mercer, Canadian Senator for Northend Halifax
- Wilfred Moore, Canadian Senator for Stanhope St./Bluenose
- Steve Morley, former professional football player (CFL, NFL)
- William Njoku, basketball player who played professionally for 10 years for various clubs in Europe
- Justin Palardy, CFL player
- Katie Pegg, Paralympic shot putter
- Gerald Regan, 19th Premier of Nova Scotia
- Dave Stala, CFL player
- Michael Ernest Sweet, writer and photographer
- Brody Steele, professional wrestler, former Strongman competitor
- Mat Whynott, Nova Scotia MLA for Hammonds Plains – Upper Sackville
- Cherno Omar Barry, Vice-Chancellor of the International Open University
- Richard William Smith, Roman Catholic Archbishop of Vancouver

== Saint Mary's University Academic Senate ==
The Saint Mary's University Academic Senate is the part of a bicameral university governance structure responsible for academic decisions at the university. It is paired with a board of governors responsible for administrative and financial decisions. The Senate has ten ex-officio members: the president, vice-presidents, deans, registrar, director of student services, director of continuing education, and university librarian. Fifteen faculty members are elected to three year terms and five students are elected by the general university population to one year terms.

=== Function ===
The academic senate is governed by the Saint Mary's University Act and subject to the powers of the university's Board and is responsible for the educational policy of the university in addition to:

- May create, maintain and discontinue such faculties, departments, schools or institutes and establish such chairs as it may determine and may fix the duties of those employed therein
- May recommend to the Board the affiliation or discontinuance of the affiliation of or with other universities
- May determine courses of study, admission standards, qualifications for diplomas, certificates and degrees, examinations, scholarships and bursaries and may issue university calendars and other official publications
- Shall be responsible for the library
- Shall be responsible for student discipline
- May create such committees as it deems necessary or useful
- May make regulations governing the matters that are assigned to it by this Section

== Media ==
Saint Mary's University had a closed circuit AM radio station that operated at 550 kHz on the AM band from 1966 until 1998. In 1982, CFSM moved from 660 kHz to 550 kHz.

== See also ==
- Canadian government scientific research organizations
- Canadian Interuniversity Sport
- Canadian industrial research and development organizations
- Canadian university scientific research organizations
- Higher education in Nova Scotia
- List of Jesuit sites
- List of universities in Nova Scotia
- Master of Management: Co-operatives and Credit Unions
- Saint Mary's Huskies
