= Doctor of Management =

Professional doctorate in management

The Doctor of Management (DM or DMgt) is an applied research doctorate (or professional practice doctorate) with a degree focus in management, leadership, and organizational topics."

The intention of the DM is to advance the skills of professionals in research, analysis, theory, and practice in organizations. The DM combines theory and applied research to understand practical outcomes and implications of research in several different business environments. Furthermore, a DM degree may enable holders to become faculty members at academic institutions. The degree was first offered at Case Western Reserve University in 1995.

== Program objectives ==
The primary aim of the Doctor of Management is to learn and understand managerial dilemmas and how to plan and implement changes and improvements in organizations as a leader, practitioner, and scholar within the respective business environment. This advanced knowledge entails practical leadership training and in-depth research in management topics with a focus on enhancing organizational effectiveness. Sometimes, the DM has an interdisciplinary style approach to management combining subjects in management, leadership, and business. In addition to learning a combination of advanced subjects, professionals pursuing a DM will learn how to conduct independent original research, analyze data, and critically evaluate theories. This body of knowledge helps the DM advance their careers in professional management, leadership, or education.

== Curriculum and admission requirements ==
Most Doctor of Management programs require a master's degree in a related field for admission. Applicants may also need acceptable graduate admission scores (e.g. GMAT or GRE), personal essays, and letters of recommendation.

The curriculum for the Doctor of Management includes a variety of teaching and learning methods for personal and professional development including lectures, presentations, independent study, doctoral supervision, cohort format, workshops, seminars, residencies, and information technologies. The curriculum includes both coursework and research. Content courses normally include management, leadership, global business, organizational design, organizational behavior, psychology, sustainability, ethics, human resource management, communications, and employee development.

DM programs require a dissertation or a research project. Depending on the institution, the length of time to complete the DM program can be 3 to 5 years full-time. The overall intention of DM coursework is to create and understand the connection between theoretical and practical knowledge through cognitive, professional, and peer learning. See PhD in management § PhD versus Doctor of Management.

== See also ==
- Doctorate
- Professional Doctorate
- Post-Doctoral Researcher
- Academic Research
- Business education § Doctoral
- Doctor of Business Administration (DBA)
- Doctor of Commerce (DCom)
- PhD in management
- List of fields of doctoral studies in the United States § Business management/administration
- Management § Training and education
