= PhD in management =

Doctor of Philosophy, PhD

PhD (Doctor Of Philosophy) in management is one of the highest academic degrees awarded in the study of management science. The degree was designed for those seeking academic research and teaching careers as faculty or professors in the study of management at business schools worldwide.

== Ph.D. in management degree ==
=== Doctoral programmes in management and organization ===
A PhD degree is a doctor of philosophy which can be obtained in many areas of study, while a PhD in management is specific to the study of research questions with potential relevance to the business world. Areas of specialization for the PhD in business often include, but are not limited to the following:

- Accounting
- Critical Management Studies
- Decision sciences (decision theory and decision analysis)
- Economics
- Economic sociology
- Entrepreneurship
- Ethics and legal studies
- Finance
- Health care management
- People management or Human Resource management
- Leadership
- Marketing
- Organizational behavior or Organizational sociology
- Operations management / Operations research
- Management information systems / Information technology management
- Political economy
- Statistics
- Strategy
- Sustainability

A PhD in management, organization or business is often required for those interested in pursuing an academic career as a professor at a business school. Business schools often require faculty to hold a Ph.D. and to engage in research. Business school rankings are often heavily influenced by the proportion of faculty with Ph.D. degrees or doctorates. Research is fundamental to the integrity of a graduate educational institution. Through research, professors gain the expertise required to teach advanced courses and to ensure that they remain current in their chosen field.

=== Brief history ===
In the 1950s and 1960s, leading business schools made a transition from vocational training to scientific research, rooted in social sciences, such as economics, psychology, sociology, anthropology, systems engineering, and mathematics. Since then, Ph.D. programs in business prepare candidates to conduct scholarly research based on rigorous methods and applied to business. For example, such research might aim to develop new theory and empirical knowledge about business and management problems by combining methods from economics, psychology and mathematical decision theory. By combining methods from multiple social sciences, business research has developed its own subfields of research, published in business application oriented journals as well as in social sciences journals.

=== Management research ===
Research with regard to the study of management and organization encompasses a wide range of activities. There are many research methodologies or "tools" one must learn before being able to conduct research. A Ph.D. program in management will teach one of these various methods.

=== Research methodologies ===
Common research methodologies used in studying business are Modeling, Econometrics, Experiments, descriptive and Field Studies.

== Program structure ==
Typically, the PhD in management takes 4–5 years to complete. The structure is usually 2 years of intensive coursework (core courses and seminars) followed by a comprehensive examination. The dissertation phase is typically 2–3 years.

== Careers ==
Becoming a professor of business means investing years of study before obtaining the desired degree, but academia offers many benefits, including attractive salaries, the combination of varied activities in one career, intellectual stimulation as well as professional autonomy. However, following through with a PhD degree can be challenging not only because of the academic rigour but also due to the pressure and stress that comes from conducting research and defending a dissertation. Moreover, once a person obtains a Ph.D., there is no guarantee that even with an offer from a business school, that the Ph.D. student will go on to publish their research in a top journal, will be able to teach effectively, or will receive a tenured faculty position.

Still, for those who have the motivation, drive, and stamina to be successful in this field, there are many benefits. The life of a business professor is markedly different from a corporate career. An academic has more time to explore their own interests, pursues research, and rarely has a 'nine to five' type of career. Being a professor is much like being an entrepreneur. Success is based on the individual, and faculty are often their own bosses. Beyond being intellectually bright and able to conduct research, professors in business also need to be able to perform in the classroom. Teaching is a fundamental component of being a professor, though most faculty may only teach around 100 hours per year, the classroom setting can be challenging and often involve debate.

Not everyone can be a professor, but for those that have the skills required, it provides an excellent standard of living, with salaries comparable to the corporate world. Consulting, book publishing and speaking engagements can also further add to overall compensation. Academic institutions are often less vulnerable than corporations to forces like global economic downturns. Academia offers much in the way of financial stability.

=== PhD versus DBA ===
The PhD in Management is similar to the Doctor of Business Administration (DBA). The PhD is a research doctorate while the DBA is most often considered a professional doctorate or an applied research doctorate for managers. As such, both PhD and DBA programs require students to develop original research leading to a dissertation defense. Furthermore, both doctorates enable holders to become faculty members at academic institutions.

In some cases, as in that of Harvard University, the distinction is solely administrative (Harvard Business School is not authorized to issue PhDs; only the Faculty of Arts and Sciences may do so). In most cases, however, the distinction is one of orientation and intended outcomes. The Ph.D. is highly focused on developing theoretical knowledge, while the DBA emphasizes applied research leading to the practical application of theoretical knowledge. Upon completion, graduates of PhD programs generally migrate to academia, while those of DBA programs reemerge in industry as executives in leading organizations often teaching part-time in undergraduate and graduate programs.

=== PhD versus Doctor of Management ===
The Doctor of Management (D.M., D.Mgt.) is a research intensive degree - including coursework, a comprehensive examination, and a research dissertation - which additionally, is "focused on developing the talents, skills and abilities of management-level staff." It is sometimes positioned as "an applied research degree within the study of management," and its coursework thus connects theoretical knowledge and practice, through cognitive, professional, and peer learning. Similar to both the Ph.D. and DBA, a D.M. enables holders to become faculty members at academic institutions." The D.M. was introduced at Case Western Reserve in 1995.

=== Doctor of Project Management ===
The Doctor of Project Management (DPM) is a research-oriented professional doctoral degree previously offered by some Australian universities, such as RMIT University in Melbourne. That program was subsumed into the RMIT PhD program around 2012. The DPM had a coursework and thesis components with the coursework being advanced project management topics to prepare candidates for their thesis work. The thesis (monograph) expectation was consistent with that expected of the PhD. Thus, the DPM is of the same academic level as traditional PhD with a research focus on industry practice rather than theoretical framework.

== See also ==
- Business education § Doctoral
- Doctor of Business Administration (DBA)
- Doctor of Commerce (DCom)
- Doctor of Management (D.M. or D.Mgt.)
- List of fields of doctoral studies in the United States § Business management/administration
- Management § Training and education
