= Master of Bioscience Enterprise =

A Master of Bioscience Enterprise (abbreviated MBE or MBioEnt) is a specialised degree taught at The University of Auckland, New Zealand, Karolinska Institute, Sweden and The University of Cambridge, United Kingdom. The MBE is an interdisciplinary programme incorporating multiple faculties and includes significant industry involvement.

The degree is primarily focused on the commercialisation of biotechnology. Both universities have developed the MBE programme to provide specialist business and legal skills relevant to employment in the bio-economy. The context in which both programmes were developed are significantly different. These differences are reflected in internship placements, thesis topics and postgraduate employment opportunities.

== University of Auckland ==
Inaugurated in 2006, the MBE programme was developed in partnership between the School of Biological Sciences (SBS), the Business School and the Law School.

=== Program Structure ===
The prerequisite for the first year (the Postgraduate Diploma) is a Bachelor of Science with a major or specialisation in Biological Sciences, Bioinformatics, Biomedical Science, Food Science, Medicinal Chemistry, Pharmacology or Physiology; a Bachelor of Engineering in Biomedical Engineering; a Bachelor of Pharmacy; or a Bachelor of Technology in Biotechnology. The Postgraduate Diploma of Bioscience Enterprise is required for entry into the Masters year. Associate degrees are also available.

=== Academic Component ===
There is an academic component in both the Post Graduate Diploma and Masters year.

==== Postgraduate Diploma Year ====
The Postgraduate Diploma year has five core papers required for the Postgraduate Diploma in Bioscience Enterprise. Students are also required to take three electives, which are generally science-based papers.

SCIENT 701 (15 points) Accounting and Finance for Scientists
SCIENT 702 (15 points) Marketing for Scientific and Technical Personnel
SCIENT 703 (15 points) Frontiers in Biotechnology
SCIENT 704 (15 points) Law and Intellectual Property
SCIENT 705 (15 points) Research Commercialisation
SCIENT 706 (15 Points) Commercialisation Project

==== Masters Year ====
SCIENT 720 (15 Points) Science Enterprise Research Methods
SCIENT 721 (15 points) Product Development and Regulatory Environments
SCIENT 722 (15 points) Current Issues in Bioscience Enterprise

==== Thesis ====
SCIENT 794 A & B(90 points)
The thesis component requires students to undertake a research project within an industry organisation. Topics vary and have included a wide variety of areas.

=== Industry Component ===
In the Masters year (year two), students undertake an internship within the biotechnology industry either in New Zealand or internationally for six months. During the internships, students complete a project for the company which generally relates to and influences the thesis topic, which is written during the internship period.

=== Awards ===
Two awards are given annually. The Baldwins award is given to the top achiever in Law and Intellectual Property. The award is designed to reward excellence in IP and encourage the graduates to consider future employment in this area. The second award is given to the student with the best Masters thesis.

== University of Cambridge ==
Founded in 2002, the MBE course is delivered by faculty of the Institute of Biotechnology and Judge Business School.

=== Academic Component ===
Students’ progress is continuously assessed, and feedback and marks from each module are provided to the students throughout the programme. There are no formal written examinations.

=== Industry Component ===
Students undertake an internship placement with a company or organisation, conducting research on a project of real commercial interest . The internship provides experience of working in a business environment as well as an opportunity to collect data as the basis for a dissertation. Students may opt, circumstances permitting, to work within multinational companies, start-ups, small to medium-sized enterprises or service providers to the biotech sector, such as accounting, legal or IP practices. Normally students spend 4 – 6 weeks with a company and are encouraged to put into practise the lessons learnt from the academic aspects of the programme as well as to demonstrate original research and analysis. The dissertation is an important component of programme assessment and contributes 30% of the total marks.
