= Amar Gupta =

American computer scientist

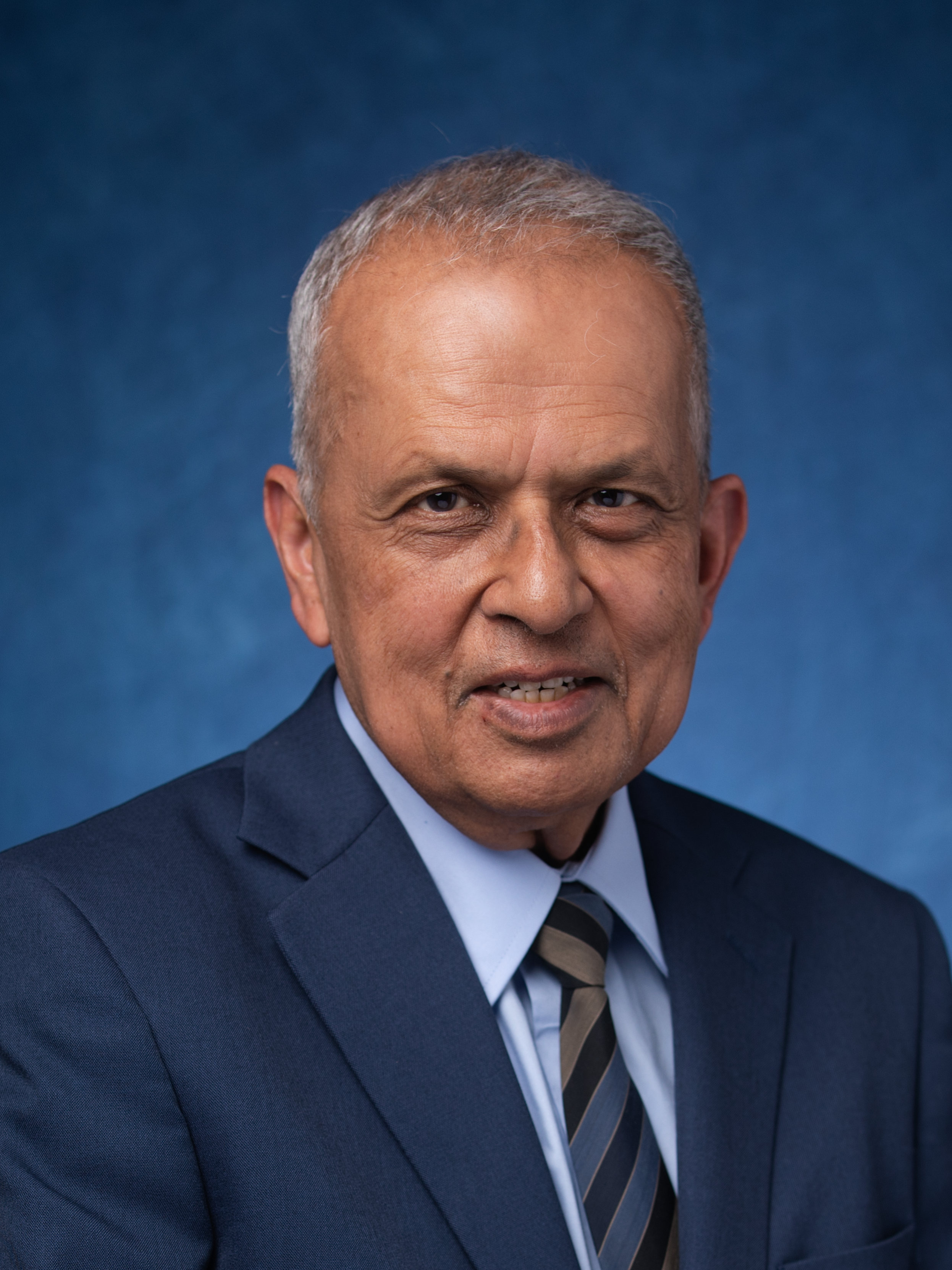
- Amar Gupta in August 2025
- Education: Indian Institute of Technology, Delhi
- Occupations: Computer scientist, university professor

Amar Gupta is an Indian computer scientist based in the United States. Gupta has worked in academics, private companies, and international organizations in positions that involved analysis and leveraging of opportunities at the intersection of technology and business, as well as the design, development, and implementation of prototype systems that led to widespread adoption of new techniques and technologies.

Gupta has spent the bulk of his career at MIT. In 2015, he rejoined MIT to work at the Institute for Medical Engineering and Sciences (IMES), Department of Electrical Engineering & Computer Science, and the Computer Science & Artificial Intelligence Lab (CSAIL) on innovation and entrepreneurship related to Digital Health and Globally Distributed Teams. He serves as Principal/Co-Principal Investigator and Coordinator for "Telemedicine" and "Enhancing Productivity of Geographically Distributed Teams" areas. Additionally, he is a Distinguished Professor at the University of Texas at El Paso.

During the interim period that he was away from MIT, Gupta served as Phyllis and Ivan Seidenberg Endowed Professor and dean of the Seidenberg School of Computer Science and Information Systems at Pace University, US, and as the Thomas R. Brown Professor of Management and Technology at the University of Arizona, US. At the latter university, he was also Professor of Entrepreneuship and Professor of MIS at Eller College of Management, Professor of Computer Science in College of Science, Professor of Latin American Studies in College of Social and Behavioral Sciences, Professor of Community, Environment and Policy in Mel & Enid Zuckerman College of Public Health, professor at James E. Rogers College of Law, Member of the HOPE Center in College of Pharmacy, and the director of Nexus of Entrepreneurship and Technology Initiative at the University of Arizona.

== Education ==
Gupta was born in Nadiad, Gujarat, India. He received Bachelor of Science in electrical engineering in 1974 from the Indian Institute of Technology, Kanpur. his undergraduate project on the design and implementation of an Electronic Taximeter was one of the two finalists for the best project of that year. In 1980, Gupta received Master of Science in management from MIT School of Management. His thesis was awarded in Brooks Prize Honorable Mention. In the same year, he received Doctorate of Philosophy in computer science from Indian Institute of Technology, Delhi for his PhD research performed at MIT.

== Life and career ==
From 1979 to 2004, Gupta served as the founding co-director of the Productivity from Information Technology (PROFIT) Initiative and an allied roles at MIT Sloan School of Management. As director of the Research Program on Communications Policy at MIT School of Engineering, Gupta coordinated the establishment of the Internet Telephony Consortium, which was subsequently renamed as the Internet and Telephony Convergence Consortium and played a pivotal role in the commercialization of the voice-over-IP technology. As associate director of MIT's International Financial Services Research Center at MIT Sloan School of Management, he initiated and mentored the research effort that ultimately led to nationwide electronic clearance of checks, the Check-21 Act in the US, and similar innovations in other countries. As Diversity Committee Member for three terms, each 3 years long, he assisted in increasing the number of underrepresented minorities at Sloan. As a supervisor, he mentored large number of students including Salman Khan (founder of Khan Academy), Ronjon Nag (founder of Cellmania and Lexicus), and Phil (Lik) Mui (who led the strategy formulation and execution of Google Analytics).

Gupta has served as advisor to a broad range of multinational corporations (including IBM, Citibank, Chevron, and American International Group) and international organizations on technology, innovation, and strategy issues. He has served as an advisor to several UN organizations including World Health Organization (WHO), United Nations Development Program (UNDP), UNIDO, and the World Bank on various aspects of national policy and large-scale information management in the context of the needs of both individual agencies and member governments. He led a UNDP team to plan and implement a national financial information infrastructure in a Latin American country where 40 percent of the banks had gone bankrupt. Gupta was part of the expert group established by the WHO to formulate policy guidelines for health informatics. These guidelines were subsequently ratified as national guidelines by over 100 countries. He also served as an UNDP advisor on a $500 million nationwide effort to get computers into every school in Brazil, and as World Bank advisor on distance education endeavor to Mozambique. He secured approval for the proposal to establish two UN Centers of Excellence in Information Technology. He was the first person to attain the rank of senior research scientist at MIT Sloan. In this position, in cooperation with Professor Lester Thurow (former dean of MIT Sloan School of Management), he launched the United States' first course on international outsourcing.

From 2004 to 2012, Gupta was appointed at the Eller College of Management at the University of Arizona as the Thomas R. Brown Professor of Management and Technology, professor of entrepreneurship and MIS; and senior director for research and business development. In this role, he has established dual degree programs with the Colleges of Agriculture, Science, Engineering, Medicine, and Optics. The program was designed to lead to two graduate degrees and a certificate in entrepreneurship. Gupta played a significant role in creating the vision for new interdisciplinary research initiatives, such as the proposed multi-college endeavor that would enable United States and Mexico to enhance healthcare in bordering areas through mutual cooperation without investing any additional funds. Another potential endeavor involves the creation of a new International Center of Excellence funded entirely through private donations.

From 2012 to 2015, Gupta worked at Pace University: Seidenberg School of Computer Science for Information Systems. As the Founder and Head of the "Nexus of Entrepreneurship and Technology" initiative, Gupta interacted with the trustees of the Thomas R. Brown Foundation to delineate and refine ideas that are of high interest to the individuals who have sponsored the endowed chair. He initiated efforts to establish major interdisciplinary initiatives in telehealth and three other areas. He supervised partnerships with healthcare IT startups and jointly won several New York City's Pilot Health Tech Innovative Project Awards and initiated new partnerships with government agencies and private organizations. One of the projects, The Telehealth Intervention Program for Seniors (TIPS), was selected for a National Association of Counties (NACo) Achievement Award in 2016.

== Research ==
=== Fairness in machine learning ===
Gupta led and coordinated two main projects on AI fairness in 2021 through 2022 (one centralizing on fairness in the mortgage lending domain and another measuring bias in opioid prescriptions). The first project was published in a special issue of Machine Learning and Knowledge Extraction and received press by the MIT News and The Boston Globe. The second project was submitted as a master thesis to MIT.

=== National policy on telemedicine ===
Gupta proposed new national policy on telemedicine, which became fully effective on June 11, 2018, by the US Department of Veterans Administration (VA). As a result, VA medical practitioners are able to offer medical services across state lines with virtually no incremental overhead.

=== Telemedicine ===
Gupta conducted research on medical personnel working during day time from diverse places around the world to perform high quality services to patients in other continent(s) during night time. This idea was explored in a paper published in Journal of Clinical Sleep Medicine.

=== 24-Hour Knowledge Factory ===
The concept of the 24-Hour Knowledge Factory was developed by Gupta. This concept allows for multiple professionals in different geographical locations to work together to perform a single task or project. Research is being conducted to utilize this model in a variety of industries. In 2007, Gupta was awarded an IBM faculty award for this vision.

=== Healthcare applications ===
Gupta proposed the notion that healthcare applications should be handled in a three pronged manner involving on-site personnel, off-site personnel, and advanced computer techniques. Mooted this model in 2001 for improved interpretation of mammograms using on-site technicians, off-site radiologists, and emerging data mining technology. This concept won the first prize in the Big Red Venture Contest at Cornell University. An extended article on this topic was published in The Wall Street Journal. A complementary video interview can be accessed at the website of The Wall Street Journal.

=== Electronic processing of bank checks ===
Gupta was the lead inventor for U.S. Patent on "System and Method for Character Recognition with Normalization", (Patent #5633954, dated May 1997). This patent played a significant role in a major court case in Canada in 2010. This invention includes the automated reading of courtesy amount (the amount denoted in numerical format) and the electronic transmission of the check to the financial institution on which the check has been issued. This concept is manifested in the Check 21 legislation in the US.

== Books ==
- Outsourcing and Offshoring of Professional Services: Business Optimization in a Global Economy (IGI Global, 2008, ISBN 978-1-59904-972-4)
- Knowledge Reuse and Agile Processes: Catalysts for Innovation (with Amit Mitra, IGI Global, 2008, ISBN 978-1-59904-921-2)
- Creating Agile Business Systems with Reusable Knowledge (with Amit Mitra, Cambridge University Press, 2006, ISBN 978-0-521-85163-3)
- Agile Systems with Reusable Patterns of Business Knowledge: A Component-Based Approach (with Amit Mitra, Artech House, 2005, ISBN 978-1-58053-988-3)

== Articles in Popular Media (Partial List) ==
- Prescription for Change, The Wall Street Journal, October 20, 2008 (extended article and online video interview).
- Expanding the 24 Hour Workplace, The Wall Street Journal, September 15, 2007 (extended article and online podcast interview).
- The Critical Role of Trusted Agents, Sloan Management Review, Volume 43, No. 4, Summer 2002, pp. 94–95.
- Personal Computers (with H.D. Toong), Scientific American, Vol. 247, No. 6, December 1982, pp. 88–99.

== Publications ==
- The Generalization Gap: Do Audio Deepfake Detectors Actually Protect Against Modern Vishing?, (with V.G.Martinez-Echevarria and R.Palacios). Electronics MDPI 2026, 15, 2846. (2026)
- Evaluating Prompt Injection Attacks with LSTM-Based Generative Adversarial Networks: A Lightweight Alternative to Large Language Models, (with S.Rashid, E.Bollis, L.Pellicer, D.Rabbani, Aneesh Gupta), Mach. Learn. Knowl. Extr. 2025, 7, 77 (2025).
- FairRAG: A Privacy-Preserving Framework for Fair Financial Decision-Making, (with R.Nagpal, U.Usua and R.Palacios), Applied Sciences, MDPI, 15(15), 8282. (2025)
- Integrating Large Language Models into Clinical Decision Support Systems: A Novel Approach to UTI Diagnosis and Treatment", (with M.Jain, H.Pokharna, S.Sunkara, S.Bora, K.Ponamgi and R.D.Sharma), Telehealth and Medicine Today, 10(2). (2025)
- Ensemble-Based Biometric Verification: Defending Against Multi-Strategy Deepfake Image Generation, (with H.Zen, R.Wagh, M.Wanderley, G.Bicalho, R.Park, M.Sun, R.Palacios, L.Carvalho and G.Rinaldo ), Computers, 14(6), 225. (2025)
- "Optimizing Fairness and Accuracy: A Pareto Optimal Approach for Decision-Making, (with R.Nagpal, R.Shahsavarifar and V.Goyal), AI and Ethics, 5(2), 1743–1756. (2025)
- "A Multi-Objective Framework for Balancing Fairness and Accuracy in Debiasing Machine Learning Models, (with R. Nagpal, A. Khan and M. Borkar), Machine Learning and Knowledge Extraction, 6(3), 2130-48. (2024)
- "Surmounting Barriers to Healthcare Data and Information: Cases in Point, the U.S. Experience", (with B.Perugu, V.Wadhwa, J.Kim, J.Cai and A.Shin), Telehealth and Medicine Today, 8(4). 2023.
- "Surmounting Barriers to Healthcare Data and Information: International Case Studies", (with B.Perugu, V.Wadhwa, J.Kim, J.Cai and A.Shin), Telehealth and Medicine Today, 8(4). (2023)
- "Pragmatic Approaches to Interoperability – Surmounting Barriers to Healthcare Data and Information Across Organizations and Political Boundaries", (with B.Perugu, V.Wadhwa, J.Kim, J.Cai and A.Shin), Telehealth and Medicine Today, 8(4). (2023)
- "EntailClass: A Classification Approach to EntailSum and End-to-End Document Extraction, Identification, and Evaluation", (with P.Balaji and H.Merker), JUCS - Journal of Universal Computer Science, 29(1), 3-15. (2023)
- ”Medical Boards: Impact of Growing Virtual Care and Need for Integrated Approach to Enhance Quality and Safety,” (with J.Halamka, L.Park, N.Kim, V.Donthireddy, M.Dogar and D.Patel), Telehealth and Medicine Today, 7(3). (2022)
- ”Developing a Novel Fair-Loan Classifier through a Multi-Sensitive Debiasing Pipeline: DualFair”, (with A.Singh, J.Singh and A.Khan), Machine Learning and Knowledge Extraction, 4(1), 240-253. (2022)
- ”Enhancing Quality of Healthcare and Patient Safety: Oversight of Physician Assistants, Nurses, and Pharmacists in Era of COVID-19 and Beyond,” (with L.Park), Telehealth and Medicine Today, 7(1). (2022)
- ”EntailSum: An Entailment-Based Approach to Aspect-Based Text Summarization with Automated Aspect Adaptation,”(with Z.Ankner, P.Balaji, Y.Zhu, C.K.Hiew, and P.Wang), International Journal of Pattern Recognition and Artificial Intelligence, 8. (2022)
- ”Modernizing Medical Licensure to Facilitate Telemedicine Delivery After the COVID-19 Pandemic,”(with C.Shachar and G.Katznelson), JAMA Health Forum, 2(5), e210405. (2021)
- “Using Bayesian Networks to Generate Synthetic Electronic Health Records Data,”(with M. S.Dhamanpreet Kaur, S.Patil, J.Liu, P.Bhagat and N.Markuzon), Journal of American Informatics Medical Association (JAMIA), 28(4), 801-811. (2021)
- ”The Effect of Role-Based Product Representations on Individual and Team Coordination Practices: A Field Study of a Globally Distributed New Product Development Team,” (with E.Mattarelli, F.Bertolotti and A.Prencipe), Organization Science, 33(4). (2021)
- ”Predictions for Telehealth in 2021: We Can’t Wait for It!,” (with L.Berkowitz, S.Vyas, I.O.Korolev and P.D.Raeve, P.Dorairaj, S.Pillon, M.Sakumoto, I.Vasiliu-Feltes, L.Ashall-Payne, M.B.Parker, B.Smith, A.Viola, R.J.Grossmann, S.Velamakanni, C.Roberts and J.D.Halamka),Telehealth and Medicine Today, 6(1) (2021)https://doi.org/10.30953/tmt.v7.363
- ”Medicare Telehealth Pre and Post-COVID-19: Interstate Framework, Regulations, Licensure, and HIPAA”,* (with S. Albanese, I. Shah and J. Mitri), Telehealth and Medicine Today, 6(4). (2021)
- ”Telemedicine for Pediatric Urological Postoperative Care is Safe, Convenient and Economical,” (with J.B.Finkelstein, D.Cahill, K. Young, K.Humphrey, J.Campbell, C.Schumann, C.P.Nelson and C.R.Estrada),The Journal of Urology, 204(1), 144-148. (2020)
- ”Evaluation of Clinician Interaction with Alerts to Enhance Performance of the Tele-Critical Care Medical Environment,” (with D.Kaur, R.J.Panos, O.Badawi, S.Bapat and L.Wang), International Journal of Medical Informatics, 139. (2020)
- ”Teleneurology Consultations for Prognostication and Brain Death Diagnosis,” (with U.M.Girkar, R.Palacios, L.H.Schwamm, P.Singla, H.May, J.Estrada, C.Whitney, M.Matiello),Telemedicine and e-Health, Mary Ann Liebert, Inc., 26(4), 482--486 (2020)
- ”Predictive Modeling for Telemedicine Service Demand,” (with A. Kumar, N. Hung, Y. Wu, and R. Baek ), Telehealth and Medicine Today, Partners in Digital Health, 5(2), 10--30953 (2020)
- ”Innovative Telemedicine Approaches in Different Countries: Opportunity for Adoption, Leveraging, and Scaling-Up,” (with M.E.Dogar, E.S.Zhai, P.Singla, T.Shahid, H.N.Yildirim and S. Singh),Telehealth and Medicine Today, 5(1) (2020)
- "Predictions for Telehealth in 2020: Will This be the Takeoff Year?,” (with M.Baird, S.Vyas, J.Reich, S.Zawada, S.Nagpal and O.J.Mechanic),Telehealth and Medicine Today, Partners in Digital Health, 4, 10--30953 (2020)
- ”Impact of Telemedicine in Pediatric Postoperative Care,” (with K. Young K. and R. Palacios), Telemedicine and e-Health, Mary Ann Liebert, Inc.,25(11), 1083--1089. (2019)
- "The Role of Brokers and Social Identities in the Development of Capabilities in Global Virtual Teams," (with E. Mattarelli, G. Carli, and M. R. Tagliaventi), Journal of International Management, 2017.
- "Third-World "Sloggers" or Elite Global Professionals? Using Organizational Toolkits to Redefine Work Identity in Information Technology Offshore Outsourcing," (with S. Koopman and E. Mattarelli), Organization Science, 27(4), July–August 2016, pp. 825 –845. Selected in 2017 for Best Published Paper of 2016 Award by the Academy of Management OCIS Division.
- "Threats to the International Trade Regime: Economic and Legal Challenges Arising from Anti-Offshoring Measures Across the Globe," (with D. Sao), The International Lawyer, Vol. 47, No. 3, 2014, pp. 407–439.
- "Navigating the Mutual Knowledge Problem: A Comparative Case Study of Distributed Work," (with S. Koppman), Information Technology & People, Vol. 27, No. 1, 2014, pp. 83–105.
- "Interoperable Electronic Health Record: A Case for Adoption of a National Standard to Stem the Ongoing Healthcare Crisis," (with D. Sao and D. A. Gantz), Journal of Legal Medicine, Vol. 34, No. 1, 2013, pp. 55–90.
- "Legal and Regulatory Barriers to Telemedicine in the United States: Private and Public Approaches Toward Healthcare Reform," in The Globalization of Health Care: Legal and Ethical Challenges, (with D. Sao and D. A. Gantz) (Glenn Cohen ed., Oxford Univ. Press), 2013.
- "A Case for Federal Regulation of Telemedicine in the Wake of the Affordable Care Act," (with Bill Marino and Roshen Prasad), Columbia Science and Technology Law Review, Vol. XVI, Spring 2015, pp. 274–357.
- "Creating the 24-Hour Knowledge Factory," (with L. Hou, T. Hedberg, C. Prendergast, and I. Crk), Information Systems Management, Vol. 29, No. 2, April 2012, pp. 100–111.
- "The Constitutionality of Current Legal Barriers to Telemedicine in the United States: Analysis and Future Directions of Its Relationship to National and International Health Care Reform," (with D. Sao), Health Matrix: Journal of Law-Medicine, Vol. 21, 2011, pp. 385–442.
- "Disputes Related to Healthcare Across National Boundaries: The Potential for Arbitration," (with D. Sao and D. A. Gantz), George Washington International Law Journal, Vol. 42, 2011, pp. 475–533.
- "Leveraging Temporal and Spatial Separations with the 24-Hour Knowledge Factory Paradigm," (with R. Bondade and I. Crk), Information Systems Frontiers, Online version since 2010, Information Systems Frontiers, Vol. 13, No. 3, July 2011, pp. 397–405.
- "Global Software Development using the 24-Hour Knowledge Factory Paradigm," (with N. Denny, K. O'Toole, R. Bondade, and D. Halder), International Journal of Computer Applications in Technology, Vol. 40, No. 3, 2011, pp. 191–202. Special Issue on Global Software Development.
- "Offshoring, IS Employment, and the IS Discipline: Additional Considerations, Journal of Information Technology, Vo. 25, 2010.
- "Neural Network Models to Detect Airplane Near-Collision Situations," (with R. Palacios, A. Doshi, V. Orlando, and B. Midwood), Journal of Transportation, Planning and Technology, Vol. 33, No. 3, April 2010, pp 237–255.
- "Information Technology Conduit as a Portal to Circumvent the Graveyard Shift," (with S. Sando, S. Parthasarthy, and S. Quan), Journal of Clinical Sleep Medicine, Vol. 6, No. 2, 2010, pp. 113–116.
- "The 24-Hour Knowledge Factory: Work and Organizational Redesign and Associated Changes," (with S. Seshasai, R. Aron, and S. Pareek), Information Management Resources Journal, Vol. 23, No. 4, 2010, pp. 40–56.
- "Harmonization of International Legal Structure for Foster Professional Services: Lessons from Early U.S. Federal-State Relations," (with D. Sao), Cardozo Journal of International and Comparative Law, Vol. 18, No. 2, Spring 2010, pp 239–294.
- "United States Federalism and Anti-Offshoring Legislation: The Constitutionality of Federal and State Measures Against Global Outsourcing of Professional Services," (with D. Sao), Texas International Law Journal, Vol. 44, Summer 2009, pp. 629–663.
- "The Use of Information Systems by Collocated and Distributed Teams: Towards the 24-Hour Knowledge Factory," (with S. Seshasai, J. Broschak and E. Mattarelli), Journal of Strategic Information Systems, Vol. 18, No. 3, 2009, pp. 147–161.
- "Offshore-Onsite Subgroup Dynamics in Globally Distributed Teams," (with E. Mattarelli), Information Technology and People, Vol. 22, 2009, pp. 242–269.
- "A Standardized Pre-Hospital Electronic Patient Care System," (with M. Gaynor, D. Myung, and S. Moulton), International Journal of Electronic Healthcare, Vol. 5, No. 2, 2009, pp. 102–136.
- "Self-Configuration and Administration on Wireless Grids," (with A. Agarwal), International Journal of Grid and High Performance Computing, Vol. 1, No. 3, 2009, pp. 37–51.
- "Anti-Offshoring Legislation and United States Federalism: The Constitutionality of Federal and State Measures Against Global Outsourcing of Professional Services" (with D. Sao), Texas International Law Journal, Vol. 44, No. 4, 2009, pp. 629–663.
- "Deriving Mutual Benefits from Offshore Outsourcing: The 24-Hour Knowledge Factory Scenario," Communications of the ACM, Vol. 52, No. 6, June 2009, pp. 122–126.
- "The 24-Hour Knowledge Factory, Can It Replace the Graveyard Shift?" IEEE Computer, Vol. 42(1), January 2009 (Cover Feature), pp. 66–73.
- "The Valuation of Technology-Based Intellectual Property in Offshoring Decisions (with G. Wiederhold, S. Tessler, and D. B. Smith), Communications of Association for Information Systems (CAIS), 2009, Vol. 24, No. 31, pp. 523-544.
- "Role of Wireless Grids in Outsourcing and Offshoring: Approaches, Architectures, and Technical Challenges," (with A. Agarwal), Journal of Information Technology Research, Vol. 2, No. 2, 2009, pp. 1–10.
- "Public and Private Sector Legal Process Outsourcing: Moving Toward a Global Model of Legal Expertise Deliverance" (with S. Borsand), PACE International Law Review, 2009.
- "Computing Aircraft Position Prediction" (with R. Palacios and A. Doshi), The Open Transportation Journal, Vol. 2, 2008, pp. 94–97.
- "Gastrointestinal Motility Online Educational Endeavor" (with S. Au), International Journal of Healthcare Information Systems and Informatics, Vol. 3, No. 1, 2008, pp. 24–43.
- "The Drug Effectiveness Reporting and Monitoring System: Discussion and Prototype Development" (with I. Crk, S. Sarnikar, and B. Karunakaran), International Journal of Technology Management, 2008.
- "A System for Processing Handwritten Bank Checks Automatically" (with R. Palacios), Image and Vision Computing. Vol. 26, No. 10, October 2008, pp. 1297–1313.
- "A Common Knowledge Sharing Model of the 24-Hour Knowledge Factory of Grid Computing based on Case Based Reasoning" (with H. Xia), International Journal of Knowledge Management, Vol. 4, No. 3, September, 2008.
- "Evolving Relationship between Law, Offshoring of Professional Activities, Intellectual Property, and International Organizations" (with D. Gantz, D. Sreecharana, and J. Kreyling), Information Resources Management Journal, Vol. 21, No. 2, April–June 2008, pp 103–126.
- "Outsourcing in the Healthcare Industry: Information Technology, Intellectual Property and Allied Aspects" (with R. Goyal, K. Joiner, and S. Saini), Information Resources Management Journal, Vol. 21, No. 1, January–March 2008, pp 1–16.
- "The Critical Role of Information Resource Management in Enabling the 24-Hour Knowledge Factory" (with S. Seshasai), Information Resources Management Journal, Vol. 20, No. 4, 2007, pp. 105–127.
- "An Information Technology Architecture for Drug Effectiveness Reporting and Post-Marketing Surveillance" (with R. Woosley, I. Crk, and S. Sarnikar), International Journal of Healthcare Information Systems and Informatics, Vol. 2, No. 3, 2007, pp. 65–80.
- "The Role of Information Resources in Enabling the 24-Hour Knowledge Factory" (with S. Seshasai), Information Resources Management Journal, Vol. 20, No. 4, October–December 2007, pp 105–127.
- "A Context-Specific Mediating Schema Approach for Information Exchange between Heterogeneous Hospital Systems" (with S. Sarnikar), International Journal of Healthcare Technology and Management, Vol. 8, No. 3/4, 2007, pp. 298–314.
- "An HL7v3-based Mediating Schema Approach to Data Transfer between Heterogeneous Health Care Systems" (with R. Martin, P. Avanavadi, and S. Sarnikar), Communications of the AIS, Vol. 19, May, 2007.
- "24-Hour Knowledge Factory: Using Internet Technology to Leverage Spatial and Temporal Separations" (with S. Seshasai), ACM Transactions on Internet Technology, Vol. 7, No. 3, August 2007, pp 1–22.
- "Offshoring: The Transition from Economic Drivers toward Strategic Global Partnership and 24-Hour Knowledge Factory" (with S. Seshasai, S. Mukherji, and A. Ganguly), Journal of Electronic Commerce in Organizations, Vol. 5, No. 2, April–June 2007, pp 1–23.
- "A Three-Faceted Educational Approach to Catalyse Innovation", Journal of Industry and Higher Education, Vol. 20, No. 4, August 2006, pp 269–272.
- "An Integrated and Collaborative Framework for Business Design: A Knowledge Engineering Approach" (with S. Seshasai and A. Kumar), Data and Knowledge Engineering, Vol.42, No. 1, Jan 2005, pp 157–179.
- "Selective and Authentic Third-party Distribution of XML Documents" (with E. Bertino, B. Carminati, E. Ferrari, and B. Thuraisingham), IEEE Transactions on Knowledge and Data Engineering, Vol.16, No. 10, Oct 2004, pp 1263–1278.
- "Handwritten Bank Check Recognition of Courtesy Amounts" (with R. Palacios and P. Wang), International Journal of Image and Graphics, Vol.4, No.2, Apr 2004, pp 1–20.
- "A Knowledge Based Approach to Facilitate Engineering Design" (with S. Seshasai), Journal of Spacecraft and Rockets, Vol. 41, No. 1, Jan – Feb 2004, pp 29–38.
- "Sistema de reconocimiento de caracteres para la lectura autom·tica de cheques" (with R. Palacios), Anales de Mecanica y Electricidad, 2003.
- "Feedback based architecture for reading courtesy amounts on checks" (with R. Palacios and P. Wang), The Journal of Electronic Imaging, Vol. 12, No. 1, Jan 2003, pp 194–202.
- "Collaborative Commerce and Knowledge Management" (with E. Bertino, E. Ferrari, and B. Thuraisingham), The Journal of Knowledge and Process Management, Vol. 9, Issue 1, 2002.
- "The Evolution of the High-End Computing Market in the United States" (with S. Deshpande, and R. Foster), The International Journal of Technology Management, Vol. 23, No. 8, Spring, 2002.
- "A Four-Faceted Knowledge Based Approach to Surmounting National and Other Borders," The Journal of Knowledge Management, Volume 5, No. 4, 2001.
- "A Self-Configuring and Self-Administering Name System with Dynamic Address Assignment", (with P. Huck, M. Butler, and M. Feng), Transactions on Internet Technology, (ACM-TOIT), Vol. 1, No. 4, 2001.
- "Data Mining for Electronic Commerce" (with Sanjeev Vadhavkar and Shiu-chung Au) Electronic Commerce Advisor, Vol. 4, Number 2, September/October 1999, pp. 24–30.
- "A Knowledge Based Segmentation Algorithm for Enhanced Recognition of Handwritten Courtesy Amounts" (with Karim Hussein, Arun Agrawal, and Patrick Shen-Pei Wang), Journal of Pattern Recognition, in Vol. 32, No 2, 1999, pp. 305.
- "A Hybrid Model Based on Dynamic Programming, Neural Networks, and Surrogate Value for Inventory Optimization Applications" (with Carlos Reyes, Auroop Ganguly and Gerardo Lemus), Journal of the Operational Research Society, Vol. 49, 1998, pp. 1–10.
- "Neural Networks Based Data Mining Applications for Medical Inventory Problems" (with Kanti Bansal, and Sanjeev Vadhavkar, International Journal of Agile Manufacturing, Vol. 1 Issue 2, 1998, pp. 187–200.
- "Telecommunications in Mexico" (with Adrian Gonzalez and Sawan Deshpande), Telecommunications Policy, Vol. 22, Issue 4-5, 1998, pp. 341–357.
- "Neural Networks Based Forecasting Techniques for Inventory Control Applications" (with Kanti Bansal and Sanjeev Vadhavkar), Data Mining and Knowledge Discovery, Vol. 2, 1998, pp. 97–102.
- "Query Optimization in Heterogeneous Distributed Information Environment" (with M.P. Reddy and B. Uma), Heuristics: The Journal of Intelligent Technologies, Vol. 10, No. 2, 1998, pp. 67–90.
- "Detection of Courtesy Amount Block on Bank Checks" (with Arun Agarwal, Karim Hussein and Patrick Wang), Journal of Electronic Imaging, Vol. 5(2), April 1996, pp. 214– 224.
- "Incremental Loading in the Persistent C++ Language E" (with Murali Vemulapati and D. Sriram), Journal of Object Oriented Programming, Vol. 8, No. 4, July–August 1995.
- "Correction of Slant in Handwritten Numerals for Automated Document Processing" (with M. V. Nagendraprasad and V. Feliberti), Engineering Applications of Artificial Intelligence, Vol. 8, No.4, 1995, pp. 469–472.
- "Formulating Global Integrity Constraints During Derivation of Global Schema" (with M. P. Reddy and B. E. Prasad), Data and Knowledge Engineering, Vol. 16, 1995, pp. 241–268.
- "Context Interchange: A Lattice Based Approach", (with M. P. Reddy), Knowledge-Based Systems, Butterworth-Heinemann, Oxford, England, 1995.
- "A Methodology for Integration of Heterogeneous Databases" (with M. P. Reddy, B. E. Prasad, and P. G. Reddy), IEEE Transactions on Knowledge and Data Engineering, Vol. 6, No. 6, 1994.
- "An Adaptive Modular Neural Network with Application to Unconstrained Character Recognition" (with Lik Mui, Arun Agarwal, and P. S. P. Wang), International Journal of Pattern Recognition and Artificial Intelligence, World Scientific Press, Singapore. Special Issue on Document Image Analysis, 1994, pp. 1189–1204.
- "A Heuristic Multi-stage Algorithm for Segmenting Simply Connected Handwritten Numerals" (with M.V. Nagendraprasad and Peter L. Sparks), Heuristics: The Journal of Knowledge Engineering & Technology, Vol. 6, No. 4, 1993, pp 16–26.
- "Algorithms for Thinning and Rethickening Digital Patterns" (with M. V. Nagendraprasad, and P. S. P. Wang), Journal of Digital Signal Processing, Academic Press, Vol. 3, No. 2, 1993, pp 97–102.
- "An Integrated Architecture for Recognition of Totally Unconstrained Handwritten Numerals", (with M. V. Nagendraprasad, A. Liu, P. S. P Wang, and A. Ayyadurai), International Journal of Pattern Recognition and Artificial Intelligence, Vol. 7, No. 4, 1993, pp. 757–773.
- "An Improved Structural Approach for Automated Recognition of Handprinted Characters" (with P. S. P. Wang), International Journal of Pattern Recognition and Artificial Intelligence, Vol. 5, 1 and 2, 1991, pp. 97–121.
- "A Microcomputer-Based Image Database Management System" (with B. E. Prasad, Hoo-min Toong, and Stuart Madnick), IEEE Transactions on Industrial Electronics, Vol. IE-24, No. 1, February 1987, pp. 83–88.
- "Increasing Throughput of Multiprocessor Systems" (with H. D. Toong), IEEE Transactions on Industrial Electronics, Vol. IE-32, No. 3, August 1985, pp. 260–267.
- "Microcomputers in Industrial Control Applications" (with H. D. Toong), IEEE Transactions on Industrial Electronics, Vol. IE-31, No. 2, May 1984, pp. 109–119.
- "A New Direction in Personal Computer Software" (with H. D. Toong), Proceedings of the IEEE, Vol. 72, No. 3, March 1984, pp. 337–388.
- "The First Decade of Personal Computers" (with H. D. Toong), Proceedings of the IEEE, Vol. 72, No. 3, March 1984, pp. 246–258.
- "Microprocessors -- The First Twelve Years" (with H. D. Toong), Proceedings of the IEEE, Vol. 71, No. 11, November 1983, pp. 1236–1256.
- "An Architectural Comparison of 32-Bit Microprocessors" (with H. D. Toong), IEEE Micro, Vol. 3, No. 1, Feb. 1983, pp. 9–22.
- "An Overview of Office Technology," Behavior and Information Technology, London, England, Vol. 1, No. 3, 1982, pp. 217–236.
- "Evaluation Kernels for Microprocessor Analyses" (with H. D. Toong), Performance Evaluation, North-Holland Publishing Company, Amsterdam, Vol. 2, No. 1, pp. 1–8, 1982.
- "An Architectural Comparison of Contemporary 16-Bit Microprocessors" (with H. D. Toong), IEEE Micro, Vol. 1, No. 2, May 1981, pp. 26–37.
