= NDHU College of Science and Engineering =

Public research school of science and engineering

- 國立東華大學理工學院
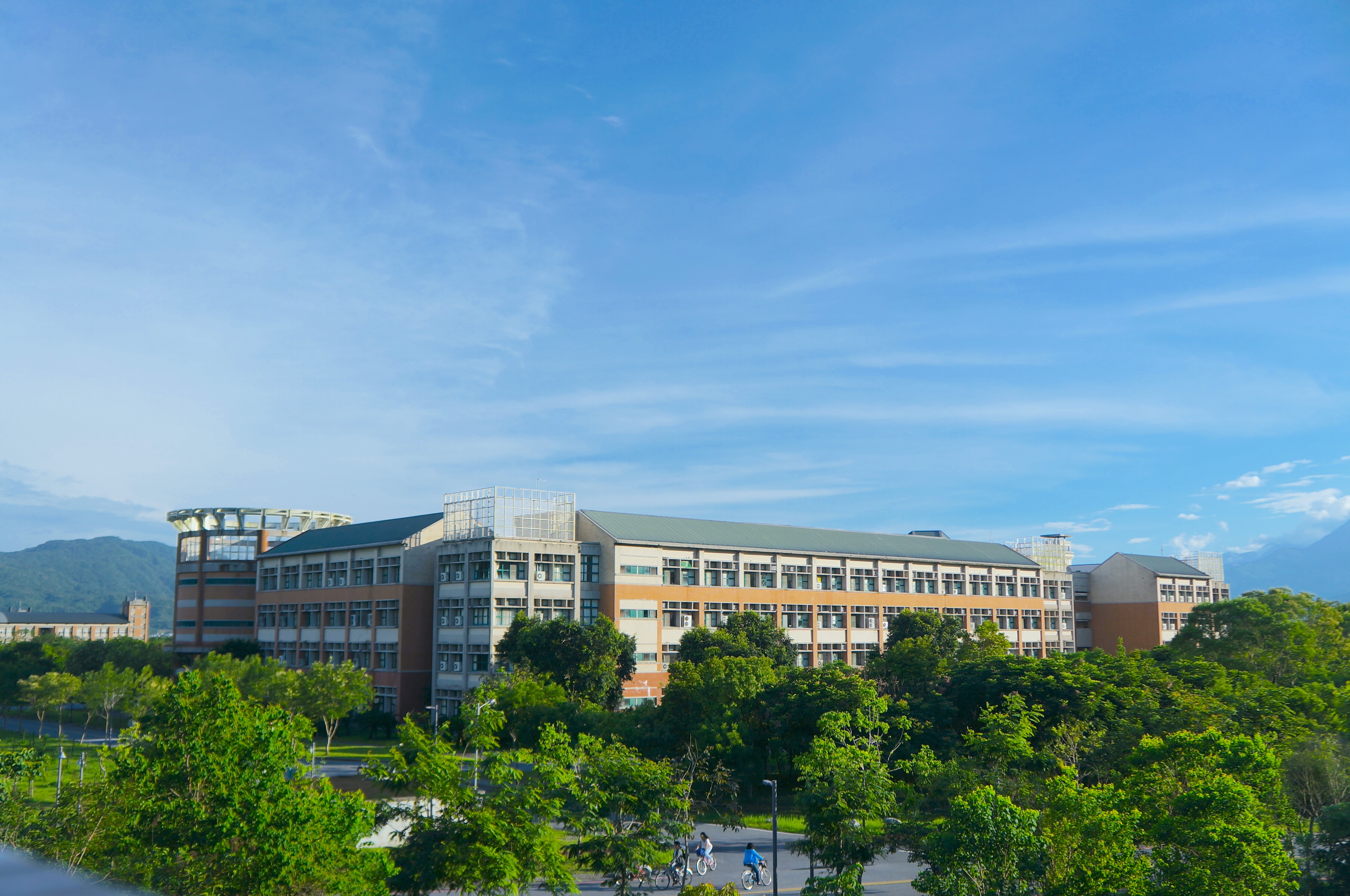
- NDHU CSAE Building II
- Type: Public (National)
- Established: 1995
- Parent institution: National Dong Hwa University
- Dean: Wu-Yuin Hwang (Distinguish Professor)
- Founding Dean: Hsia Yu-Ping (Chair Professor at Yale University)
- Faculty: 128 (Fall 2024)
- Students: 2300+（2020）
- Undergraduates: 1967（2020）
- Postgraduates: 375 （2020）
- Campus: Shoufeng Campus
- Website: CSAE.NDHU.edu.tw

NDHU College of Science and Engineering (NDHU CSAE; Chinese: 國立東華大學理工學院; pinyin: Dōnghuá Lîgōng Xuéyuàn) is an interdisciplinary school of science and engineering of National Dong Hwa University. Established in 1995, NDHU CSAE was founded with Hsia Yu-Ping, the Chair Professor of Yale University and California Institute of Technology, as Founding Dean, which is the second interdisciplinary school of Science and Engineering in Taiwan.

NDHU CSAE was founded by a batch of Taiwanese-American scholars from United States, Canada. The college was selected one of eight "National Key Bilingual College" for Science and Engineering by the Ministry of Education (MOE) in 2021. The college offers BS, MSc, and PhD's programs with its research center and faculty, including one international member of National Academy of Sciences, four IEEE Fellows, six IET Fellows, one BCS Fellow, nine Distinguished Professors, and 10 of the Stanford's Top 2% Scientists.

== History ==
=== Foundation ===
In 1994, National Dong Hwa University was established, founding the Graduate Institute of Applied Mathematics as a precursor to NDHU College of Science and Engineering. The Graduate Institute of Applied Mathematics attracted many oversea scholars, including Fu James, Professor of Statistics at University of Manitoba, Wu Tiee-Jian, Professor of Mathematics at University of Houston, and Research Fellows Cheng Philip E. and Chiang Tzuu-Shuh from Institute of Statistical Science at Academia Sinica.

With Hsia Yu-Ping, Chair of Chemistry at California State Polytechnic University, Pomona, returned from United States, NDHU College of Science and Engineering (NDHU CASE) was founded in 1995 as Taiwan's 2nd institution for Natural Sciences and Engineering to serve the interdisciplinary trend of both disciplines. In 1995, NDHU CSAE was established with 3 graduate institutes - Graduate Institute of Applied Mathematics, Graduate Institute of Computer Science and Information Engineering, and Graduate Institute of Material Science and Engineering. These graduate institutes were founded by many Taiwanese scholars from United States, including Kuo Sy-Yen, Professor of Electrical and Computer Engineering at University of Arizona, and Wong Ming-Show, Research Scientist of Materials Research Center at Northwestern University as Founding Director.

In 1996, NDHU College of Science and Engineering established Graduate Institute of Biotechnology, which offered Taiwan's first degree for Biotechnology. NDHU CSAE established Graduate Institute of Chemistry, which was co-founded by Hsia Yu-Ping, Chair Professor of Chemistry at Yale University, Hwang Wen-Shu, Chair of Chemistry at National Sun Yat-sen University, and Tsai Ying-Ren, Chair of Chemistry at Chung Yuan Christian University. Meanwhile, Department of Applied Mathematics was established and inaugurated the College of Science building (now the Science and Engineering Building I).

In 1997, NDHU CSAE established Department of Physics, Department of Life Sciences, Department of Computer Science and Information Engineering, and Graduate Institute of Electrical Engineering. The Department of Physics was with Wang Jixiang, Professor of Physics at North Carolina State University as Founding Chair. The Department of Life Sciences was Taiwan's 3rd oldest academic institution for life sciences. (Note: NTHU LS（1991）、NYMU LS（1996）、NDHU LS（1997）、NCU LS（1999）、NCHU LS（2002）、NTNU LS（2002）、NTU LS（2003）、NCKU LS（2004）、NTUO LS（2005）)

In 1998, NDHU CSAE established Department of Chemistry and PhD program in Applied Mathematics, later was one of Taiwan's oldest PhD program in Applied Mathematics. In 1999, the Department of Electrical Engineering was established. In 2000, the Department of Material Science and Engineering was established. In 2001, NDHU CSAE established Graduate Institute of Applied Physics, PhD program in Computer Science and Information Engineering (CSIE), and PhD program in Chemistry (CHEM). In 2002, PhD program in Electrical Engineering (EE) and PhD program in Material Science and Engineering (MSE) were established. In 2003, NDHU CSAE launched PhD program in Applied Physics (AM).

In 2005, NDHU College of Science and Engineering inaugurated Engineering Building II (now the Science and Engineering Building II). In 2006, NDHU CSAE established Graduate Institutes of Opto-electronic Engineering and Graduate Institutes of Electronic Engineering were established, with Ho Ching-Hwa, Fellow of Optical Society of America (OSA), and Chi Jim-Yong, Chair of Opto-Electronics & Systems at Industrial Technology Research Institute, as Founding Director.

=== Present ===
In 2008, with the merger of National Dong Hwa University (NDHU) and National Hualien University of Education (NHUE), NDHU College of Science and Engineering integrated NHUE's academic units, including Departments of Mathematics, Departments of Information Science, Departments of Applied Science, and Graduate Institute of Learning Technology. In 2010, NDHU CSAE established the Department of Opto-electronic Engineering and MS program in Statistics. In 2011, NDHU CSAE established International BS and MS programs in Computer Science and Information Engineering, which offered Taiwan's first English-taught degree programs for Computer Science and Computer Engineering.

In 2012, NDHU CSAE of Science and Engineering opened the 3rd research building, Science and Engineering Building III. From 2012 to 2023, NDHU CSAE established 10 international MS and PhD programs in Applied Physics, Chemistry, Biotechnology, Electrical Engineering, and Material Science and Engineering. In 2023, Department of Life Science and Graduate Institute of Biotechnology were marged as Department of Biochemistry and Molecular Medicine. In 2024, NDHU College of Science and Engineering launched International BS in Data Science, marking its first college-level international bachelor's program. In 2025, NDHU CSAE launched International BS in Biomedical Sciences and Biochemistry, the 2nd college-level international bachelor's program.

== Degree programs ==
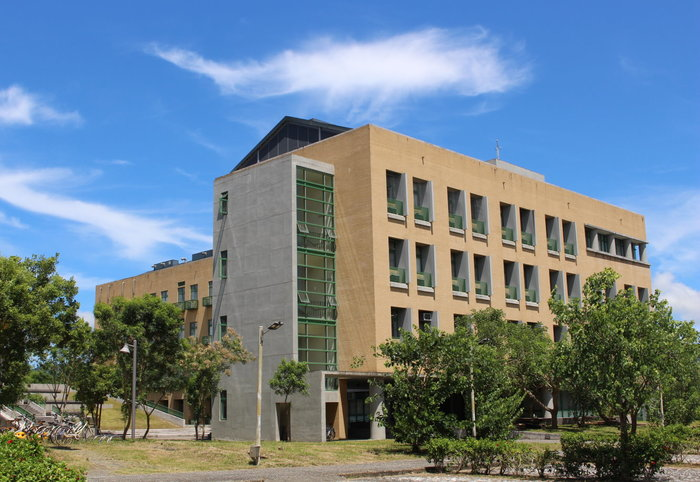
NDHU College of Science and Engineering Building III, where the Department of Biochemistry and Molecular Medicine is based

=== Graduate ===
==== Doctor of Philosophy (PhD) ====
The doctoral program (PhD) at NDHU School of Management is a full-time, in-residence program intended for students who plan scholarly careers involving research and teaching in management. There are eight major tracks for PhD students follow at NDHU College of Science and Engineering:

- PhD in Applied Mathematics
- PhD in Applied Physics
- PhD in Chemistry
- PhD in Biochemistry and Molecular Medicine
- PhD in Electrical Engineering
- PhD in Computer Science and Information Engineering
- PhD in Materials Science and Engineering

==== Master of Science (M.S.) ====
There are eight specialization M.S. programs students can choose from:

- MS in Applied Mathematics
- MS in Statistics
- MS in Applied Physics
- MS in Chemistry
- MS in Biochemistry and Molecular Medicine
- MS in Electrical Engineering
- MS in Computer Science and Information Engineering
- MS in Artificial Intelligence and Innovative Applications
- MS in Materials Science and Engineering
- MS in Opto-Electronic Engineering

=== Undergraduate ===
NDHU College of Science and Engineering offers nine programs in different majors.

- Bachelor of Science (BS) in Mathematical Science
- Bachelor of Science (BS) in Statistical Science
- Bachelor of Science (BS) in Data Science
- Bachelor of Science (BS) in Physics
- Bachelor of Science (BS) in Nano & Photoelectronic Science
- Bachelor of Science (BS) in Chemistry
- Bachelor of Science (BS) in Biochemistry and Molecular Medicine
- Bachelor of Science (BS) in Biomedical Sciences and Biochemistry
- Bachelor of Science (BS) in Electrical Engineering
- Bachelor of Science (BS) in Computer Science and Information Engineering
- Bachelor of Science (BS) in Materials Science and Engineering
- Bachelor of Science (BS) in Opto-Electronic Engineering

These programs operate on a modular system, allowing students to design their curricula and manage their study pace. They may also take interested modules, subject to prerequisite requirements and modules availability.

== Academics ==
=== Reputation and ranking ===
- NDHU College of Science and Engineering Rankings

Global – Science and engineering
| ARWU Electrical & Electronic Engineering | 401–500 (2021) |
| THE Engineering | 601–800 (2022) |
| THE Computer Science | 301–400 (2022) |
| RUR Computer Science | 356 (2024) |
| NTU Ranking Computer Science | 301–350 (2022) |

Global – Medicine and Biology
| RUR Medical Science | 403 (2024) |

National – Science and engineering
| ARWU Electrical & Electronic Engineering | 4 (2021) |
| THE Engineering | 7 (2022) |
| THE Computer Science | 5 (2022) |
| RUR Computer Science | 7 (2024) |
| NTU Ranking Computer Science | 5 (2022) |

National – Medicine and Biology
| RUR Medical Science | 5 (2024) |

NDHU College of Science and Engineering was ranked among world's top 400 and Taiwan's top five schools of computer science and electrical engineering by Times Higher Education World University Ranking, NTU Ranking, Round University Ranking, and it was ranked world's 403th and Taiwan's 5th for medical science by Round University Ranking.

==== TSMC Semiconductor Program ====
In 2025, NDHU College of Science and Engineering established a partnership with Taiwan Semiconductor Manufacturing Company (TSMC) to co-found the Semiconductor Program (Chinese: 半導體學程), becoming the first partner university in eastern Taiwan. The initiative is coordinated by the Department of Electrical Engineering, working with the Departments of Materials Science and Engineering, Chemistry, Opto-Electronic Engineering, Physics and Computer Science. It offers three training tracks that follow the curriculum framework set by TSMC:

- Device/Integration Track – fundamentals of electronics, electromagnetics, solid-state physics and semiconductor processing, plus introductory IC design and materials analysis.
- Advanced Circuit Design Track – logic and SoC design, EDA tools and machine learning for cutting-edge integrated-circuit development.
- Process/Module Track – cross-disciplinary coursework in materials science, analytical chemistry and process control.

Students who complete any track may apply for internships and receive priority consideration for graduate-level positions at TSMC; high achievers are eligible for differentiated salary packages.

==== National Bilingual Key College Program ====
In 2021, NDHU CSAE was selected as Taiwan's eight schools of science and engineering as "National Bilingual Key Colleges" by Ministry of Education for the Policy of 2030 Bilingual Nation.

=== Departments and research centers ===
The NDHU College of Science and Engineering offers programs at both the graduate and undergraduate levels, including Bachelor's degrees, Master's degree, and PhDs. Degrees are offered in the majors such as Applied Mathematics, Chemistry, Biochemistry and Molecular Medicine, Electrical Engineering, Computer Science and Information Engineering, Materials Science and Engineering, and Opto-Electronic Engineering.

==== Departments/Graduate Institutes ====
- Department of Applied Mathematics (B.S., M.S., Ph.D.)
- Department of Physics (B.S.)
- Department of Chemistry (B.S., M.S., Ph.D.)
- Department of Biochemistry and Molecular Medicine (B.S., M.S., Ph.D.)
- Department of Electrical Engineering (B.S., M.S., Ph.D.)
- Department of Computer Science and Information Engineering (B.S., M.S., Ph.D.)
- Department of Materials Science and Engineering (B.S., M.S., Ph.D.)
- Department of Opto-Electronic Engineering (B.S., M.S.)
- Graduate Institute of Applied Physics (M.S., Ph.D.)

==== Research Centers ====
The School is home to several research facilities, in the fields of Energy Technology, Intelligent Technology, Toxicology, nanotechnology.

- Center for Bilingual Education and International Affairs
- Energy Technology Center
- Intelligent Technology Center
- Eastern Taiwan Center for Pesticide and Toxic Substance Analysis
- Agricultural Certification and Service Enhancement Center
- High-valued Instrument Center

== Notable faculty ==
The NDHU CSAE's faculty includes one International Fellow of National Academy of Sciences, one academician of the Academia Sinica, four fellows of the Institute of Electrical and Electronics Engineers (IEEE), six fellows of the Institution of Engineering and Technology (IET), and one fellow of the British Computer Society (BCS).

Prominent Scholars in NDHU CSAE:

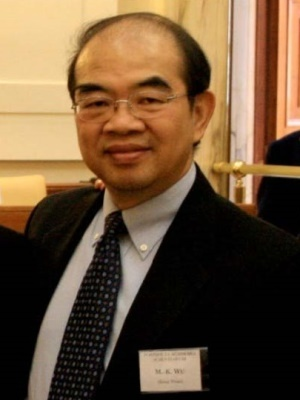
Taiwan's first International Fellow of National Academy of Sciences (2004) Maw-Kuen Wu

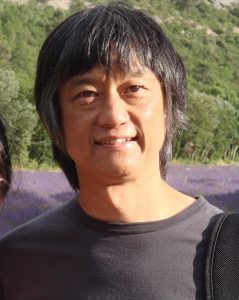
Foreign Member of A.M. Prokhorov Academy of Engineering Sciences, Russia (2016) Chia-Liang Cheng

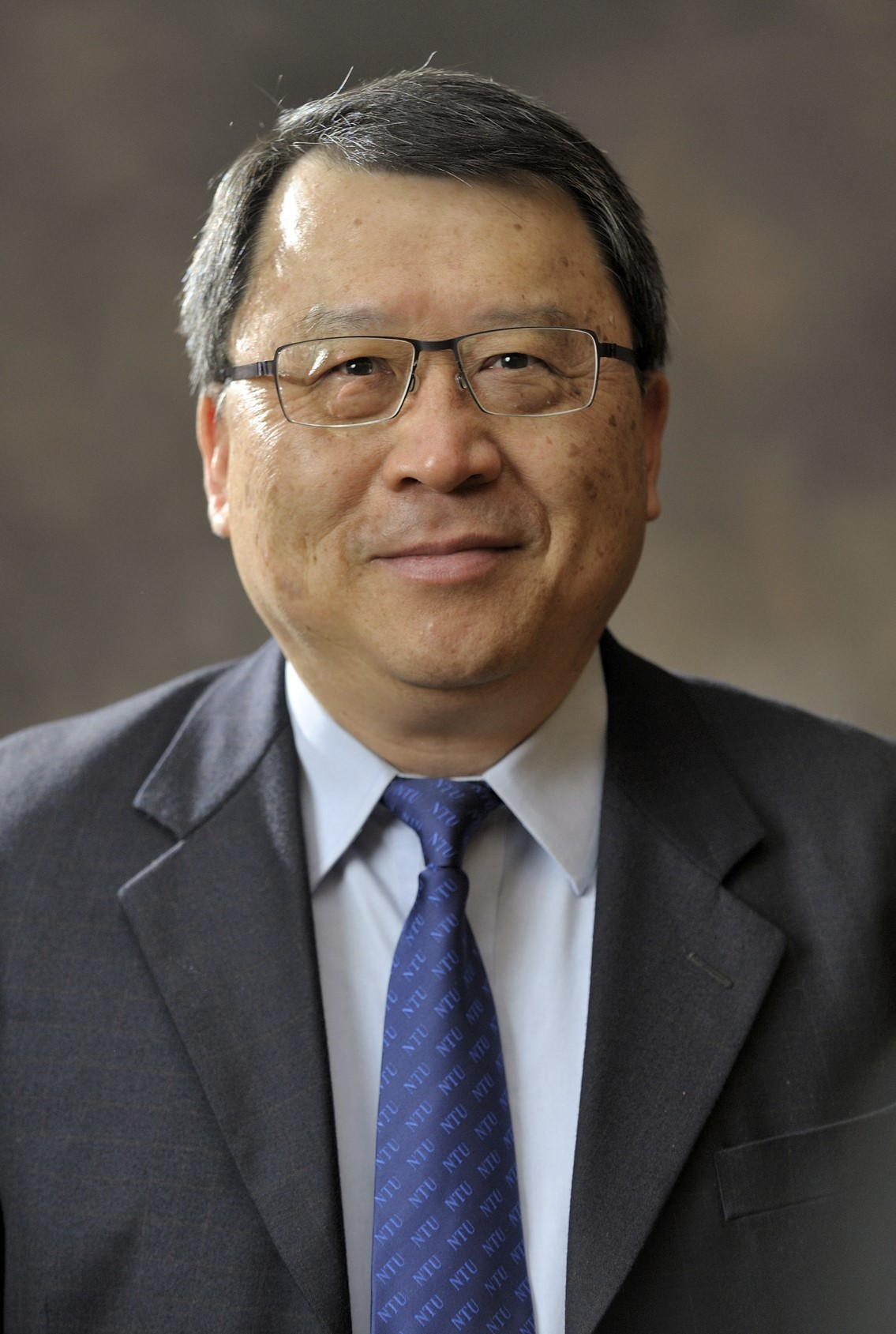
Life Fellow of Institute of Electrical and Electronics Engineers (IEEE) and vice-president of Institute of Electrical and Electronics Engineers Computer Society Sy-Yen Kuo

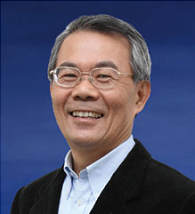
Life Fellow of Institute of Electrical and Electronics Engineers (IEEE) Chung-Ju Chang

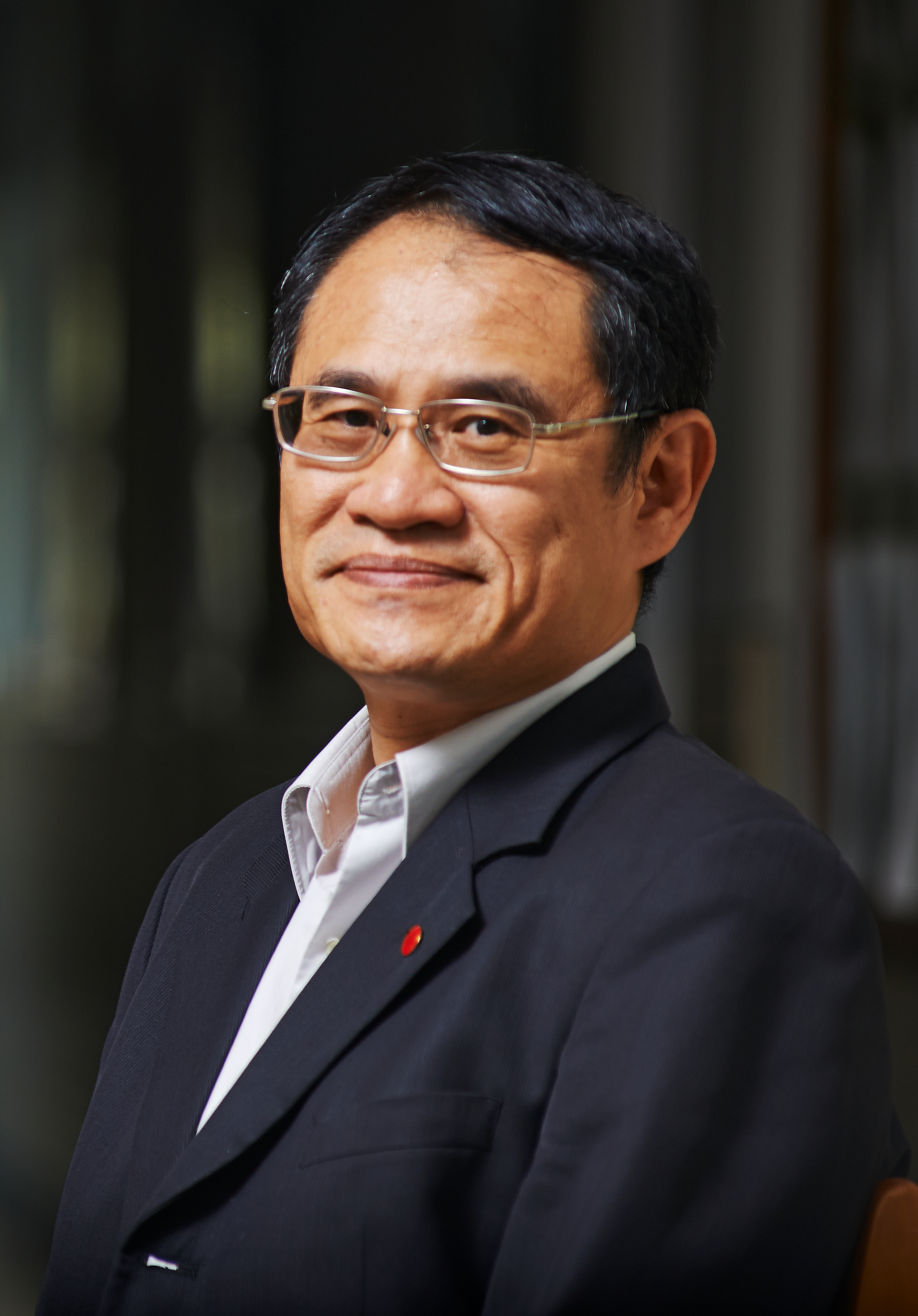
President of National Applied Research Laboratories and Fellow of Institute of Electrical and Electronics Engineers (IEEE) Faa-Jeng Lin

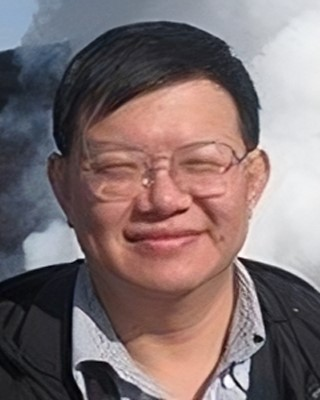
Fellow of Institute of Electrical and Electronics Engineers (IEEE) Li-Chun Wang

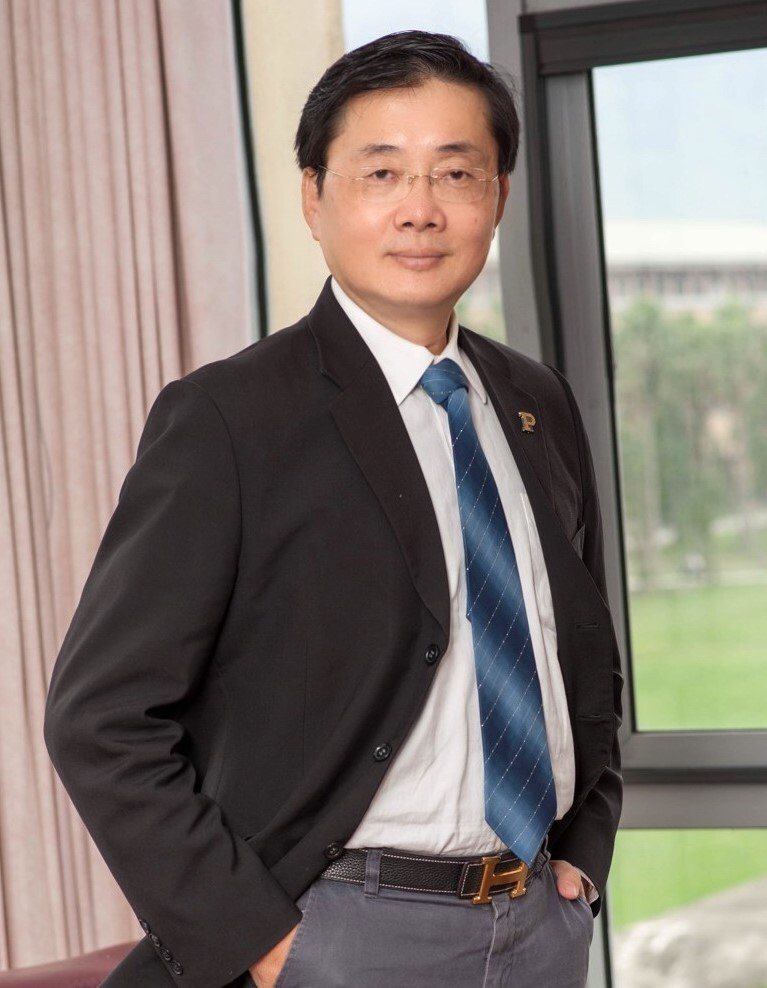
Fellow of Institution of Engineering and Technology (IET) and Fellow of British Computer Society (BCS) Han-Chieh Chao

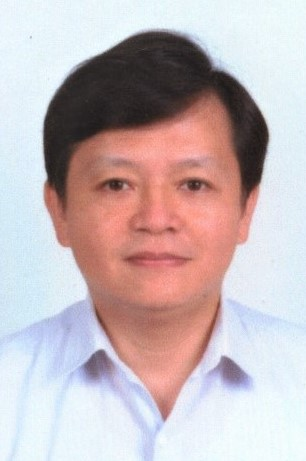
Fellow of Institution of Engineering and Technology (IET) Shin-Feng Lin

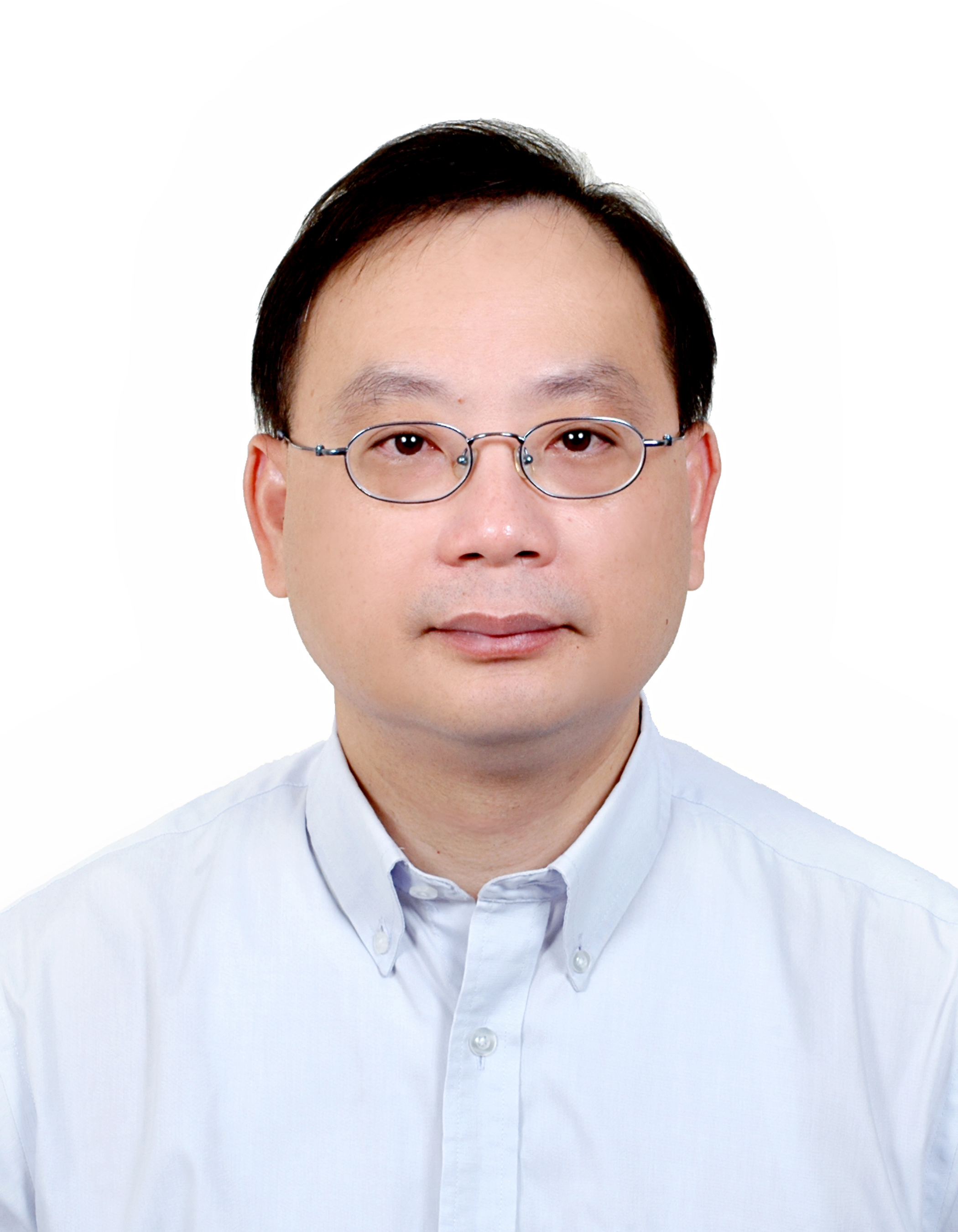
Fellow of Institution of Engineering and Technology (IET) Ching-Nung Yang

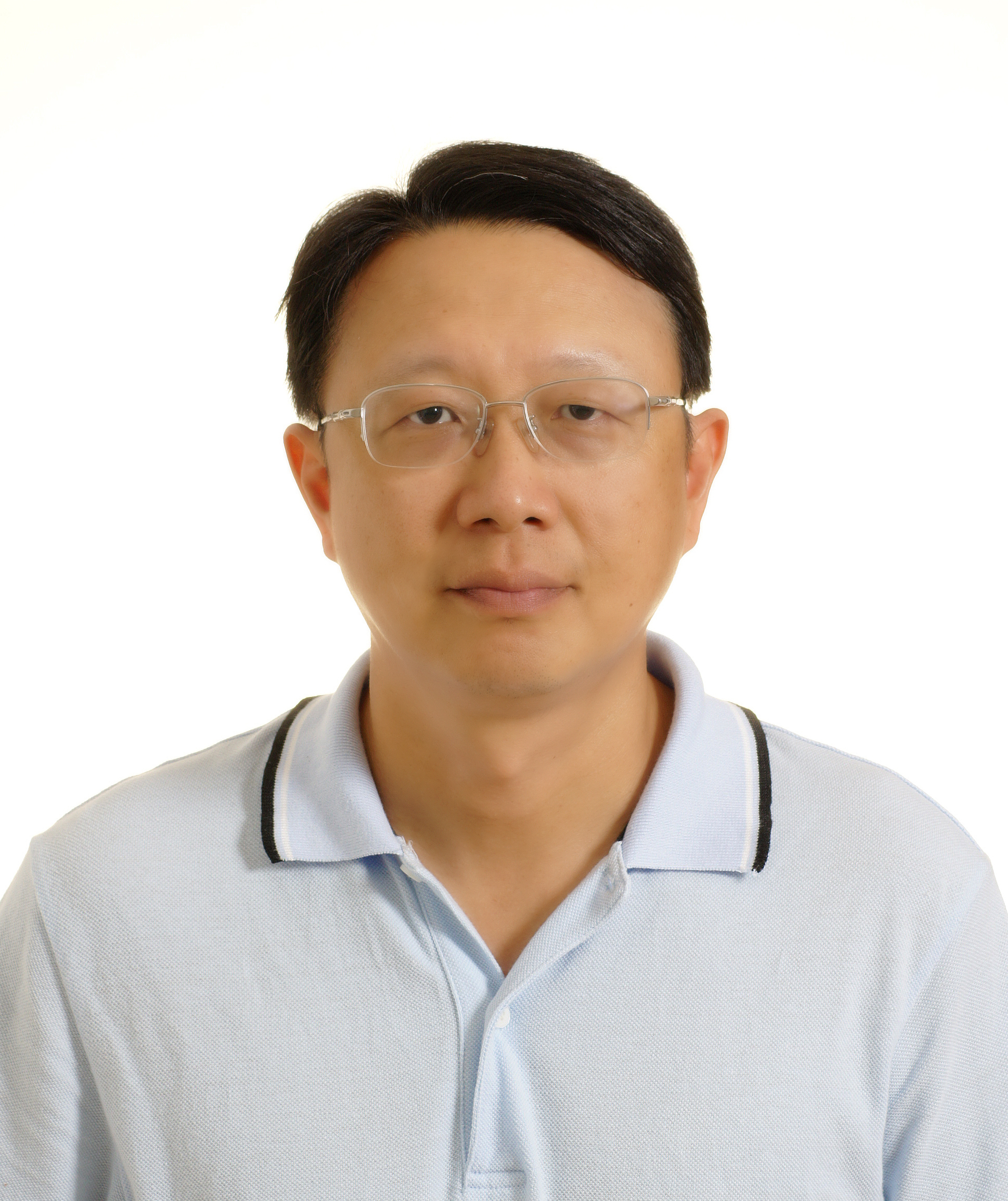
Laureate of Les Grands Prix from Institut de France (2016) Chen-Wei Liu

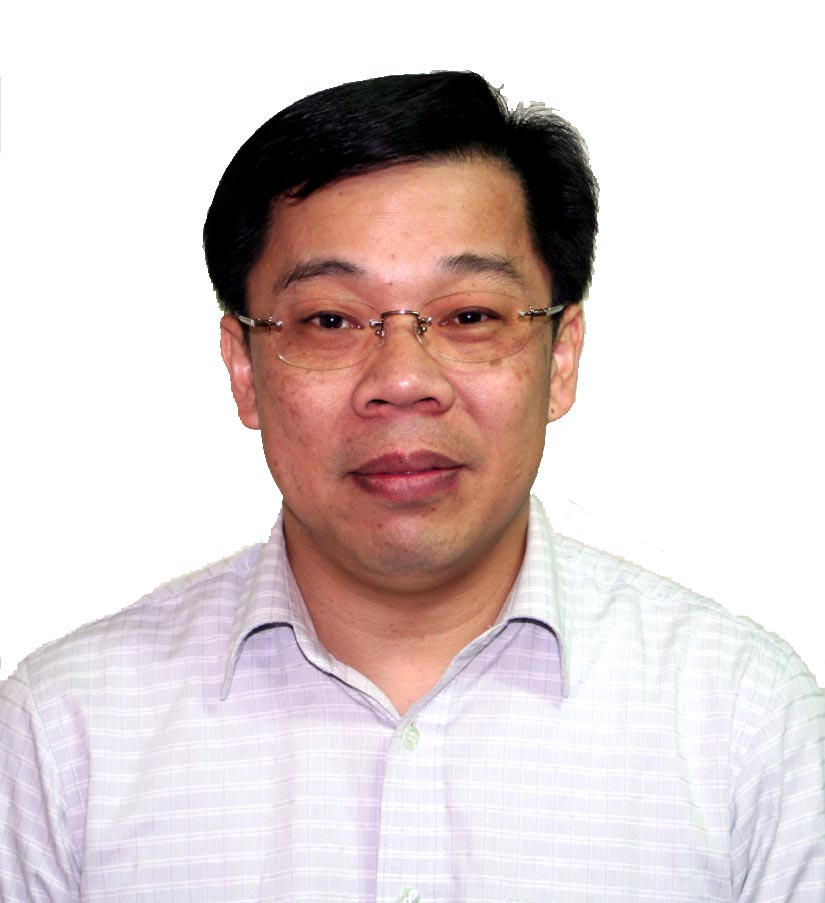
Fellow of Optical Society of America (OSA) Ching-Hwa Ho

== See also ==
- National Dong Hwa University
- NDHU Department of Computer Science and Information Engineering
