= Billaut =

Billaut is a French surname. Notable people with the surname include:

- Adam Billaut (1602–1662), French carpenter, poet and singer
- Hervé Billaut (born 1964), French classical pianist
- Jean-Michel Billaut (1945–2025), French systems analyst and internet personality
- Julien Billaut (born 1981), French slalom canoeist
