= NDHU Department of Computer Science and Information Engineering =

Taiwan's leading School for Computer Science

- 國立東華大學資訊工程學系
- Former names: Graduate Institute of Computer Science and Information Engineering
- Type: Public; Computer Science
- Established: September 1, 1995
- Founders: Sy-Yen Kuo PhD (Professor of Electrical and Computer Engineering at University of Arizona)
- Parent institution: NDHU College of Science and Engineering
- Chair: I-Cheng Chang PhD
- Academic staff: IET Fellow 2 Distinguished Professor 3 Professor 11; Associate Professor 6 Assistant Professor 4
- Undergraduates: 536 (2023 Fall)
- Postgraduates: 150 (2023 Fall)
- Doctoral students: 13 (2023 Fall)
- Location: Shoufeng, Hualien, 974301, Taiwan
- Website: CSIE.NDHU.edu.tw

NDHU Department of Computer Science and Information Engineering (NDHU CSIE; Chinese: 國立東華大學資訊工程學系) is a research-intensive school of Computer Science within NDHU College of Science and Engineering and widely regarded as top 5 academic department of computer science in Taiwan. NDHU CSIE has Taiwan's largest percentage of international students, with more than one-third coming from countries outside of Taiwan.

According to Times Higher Education, both its undergraduate and graduate programs rank in the top five among Taiwanese universities. The department ranks highest in Taiwan in academic impact by THE Subject Rankings. According to NTU Ranking, the department ranks Top 350 in the world. It was evaluated A level globally by THE China Subjects Ranking. NDHU CSIE's faculty includes 1 IEEE Life Fellow, 4 IET Fellows, 1 BCS Fellow, 4 World's Top 2% Scientists.

== History ==
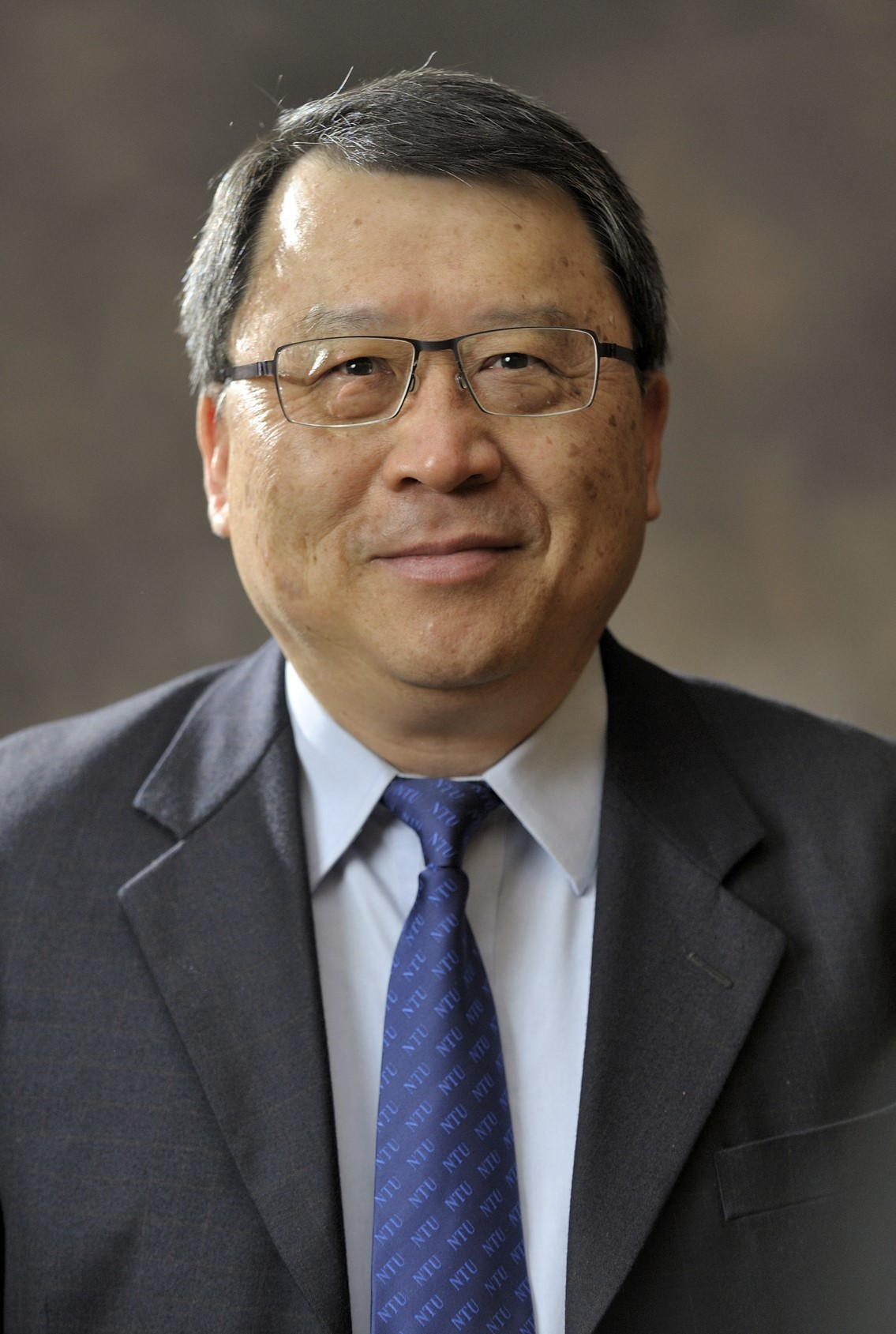
Sy-Yen Kuo (郭斯彥), the Founding Director of NDHU CSIE, which is the Professor of Electrical and Computer Engineering at University of Arizona, Dean of College of Electrical Engineering & Computer Science at National Taiwan University.

=== Foundation ===
In 1995, NDHU Graduate Institute of Computer Science and Information Engineering was founded by Sy-Yen Kuo (郭斯彥), the Professor of Electrical and Computer Engineering at University of Arizona and Dean of College of Electrical Engineering & Computer Science at National Taiwan University, as the first computer science department in Eastern Taiwan. In 1997, the graduate institute founded bachelor's program and become Department of Computer Science and Information Engineering. In 2000, the department founded its first executive master's program, the alumni include the Da-Kuei Lin (林大馗), the vice-president of KPMG Cyber Security in Taiwan.

=== Expansion ===
In 2001, NDHU CSIE established the 1st PhD program in Computer Science and Information Engineering in Eastern Taiwan. In 2008, with the merger of National Dong Hwa University (NDHU) and National Hualien University of Education (NHUE), NHUE's Graduate Institute of Information Science and Graduate Institute of learning Sciences were merged into the department, which were later integrated into the Graduate Institute of Networking and Multimedia Technology in 2009.

=== Internationalization ===
In 2010, the department started English-taught classes and accepting international students application undergraduate, master, PhD. In 2014, following the funding and support from International Cooperation and Development Fund (TaiwanICDF; 國際合作發展基金會) of Ministry of Foreign Affairs, NDHU CSIE founded the International Bachelor's and Master's Program in Computer Science and Information Engineering, which were the 1st international program of B.S. and M.S. in computer science in Taiwan.

In 2019, the International Bachelor Program in Computer Science and Information Engineering was selected as TaiwanICDF Scholarship Program, which was the only computer science program in the scholarship and provided full funding for selected applicants. In 2021, the department's TaiwanICDF Scholarship Program received 158 applications with 9.4% admission rate, which was highest numbers of program application in the TaiwanICDF Scholarship.

== International Scholarship ==
=== ICDF Scholarship ===
The TaiwanICDF states that its International Higher Education Scholarship Program provides full scholarships to outstanding students from partner countries through cooperating universities in Taiwan. As of 2026, NDHU CSIE's eligible TaiwanICDF programs included the department's International Bachelor Program in Computer Science and Information Engineering and the International Master Program in Artificial Intelligence and Innovative Applications.

=== Taiwan-Europe Connectivity Scholarship ===
NDHU CSIE has also taken part in the Taiwan-Europe Connectivity Scholarship initiative. A Ministry of Education project page recorded that 15 students visited NDHU in 2022 for short-term study through the program. In the 2026 Taiwan-Europe Scholarship guidebook published by TaiwanICDF, NDHU's International Master Program in Artificial Intelligence and Innovative Applications was listed among the eligible master's programs.

== Degrees and programs ==
=== Undergraduate ===
NDHU CSIE offer the Bachelor of Science (B.S.) in Computer Science and Information Engineering. The department also offers one 5-year bachelors/masters programs: Bachelor of Science/Master of Science (B.S./M.S.) in Computer Science and Information Engineering and sponsors a minor in computer science available to all NDHU students.

=== Graduate ===
NDHU CSIE offers one Ph.D. and three M.S. programs, and provides double degrees and minor jointly with all academic institutions in NDHU.

- Doctor of Philosophy (Ph.D.) in Computer Science and Information Engineering
- Master of Science (M.S.) in Computer Science and Information Engineering
- Master of Science (M.S.) in Artificial Intelligence and Innovative Applications
- Executive Masters of Computer Science and Information Engineering

== Ranking ==
- NDHU Department of Computer Science and Information Engineering Rankings

Global Ranking
ARWU Electrical & Electronic Engineering	401-500
NTU Ranking Computer Science	301–350
THE Computer Science	301–400
THE Information and Communication Engineering	A Level

National Ranking
ARWU Electrical & Electronic Engineering	4
NTU Ranking Computer Science	5
THE Computer Science	5
THE Information and Communication Engineering	2

NDHU CSIE' is well regraded as Top 5 and most premier program in Computer Science in Taiwan, which holds same academic status for Computer Science with University of Florida in United States, Kyushu University in Japan, McMaster University in Canada, Lund University in Sweden, and Universität Hamburg in Germany by Times Higher Education World University Ranking.

NDHU CSIE is ranked A Level globally for Information and Communication Engineering by THE China Subject Ratings, which is only next to National Taiwan University (A+) and holds same academic status with National Tsing Hua University (A) and National Cheng Kung University (A).

According to Academic Ranking of World Universities, it is ranked No.4 in Taiwan and 401-500 in the world for Electrical & Electronic Engineering, which holds same academic status with Kyoto University in Japan, Rice University in United States, and University of Birmingham in United Kingdom.

== People ==
Notable present and past NDHU Department of Computer Science and Information Engineering faculty include:

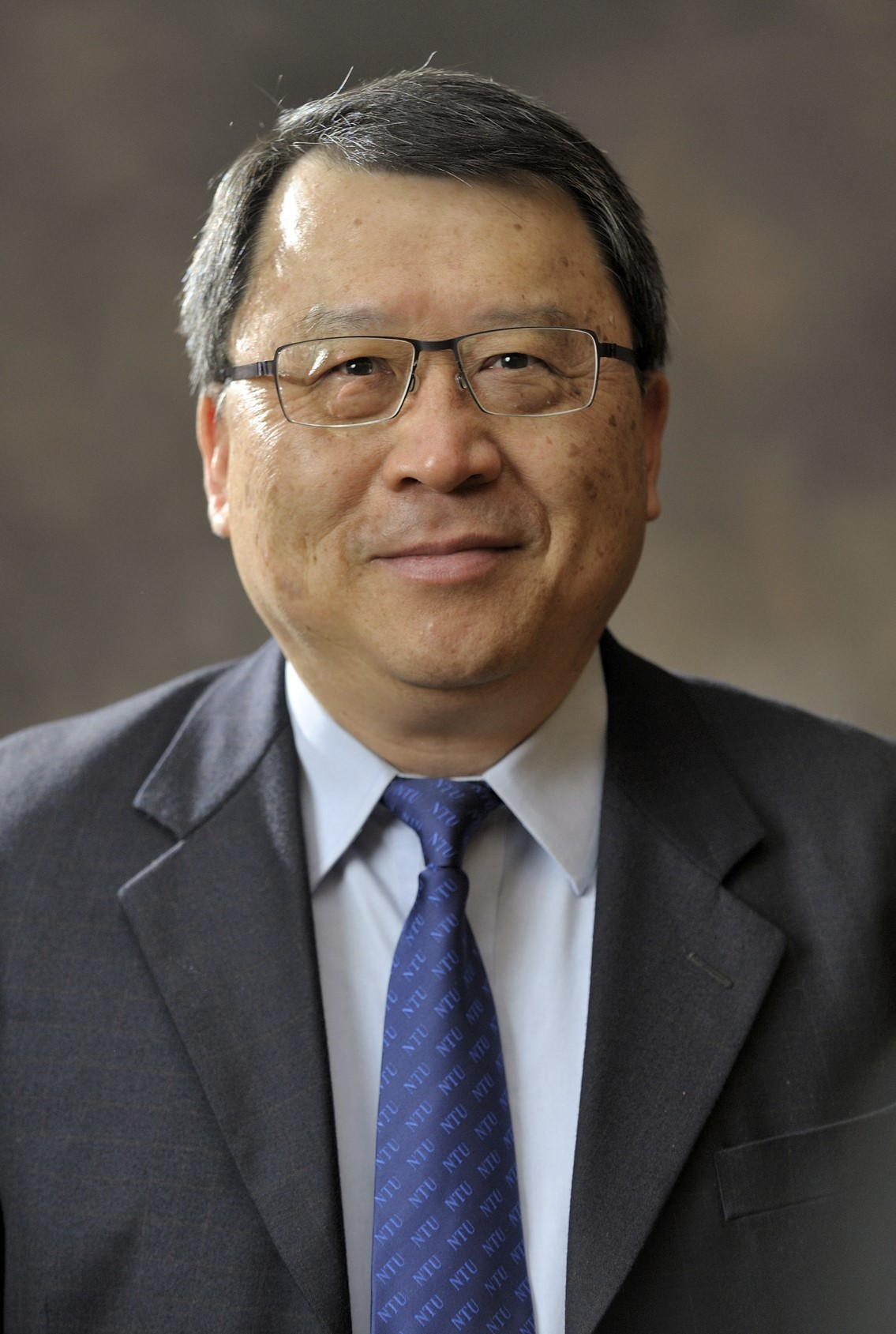
Sy-Yen Kuo
Life Fellow of Institute of Electrical and Electronics Engineers (IEEE)

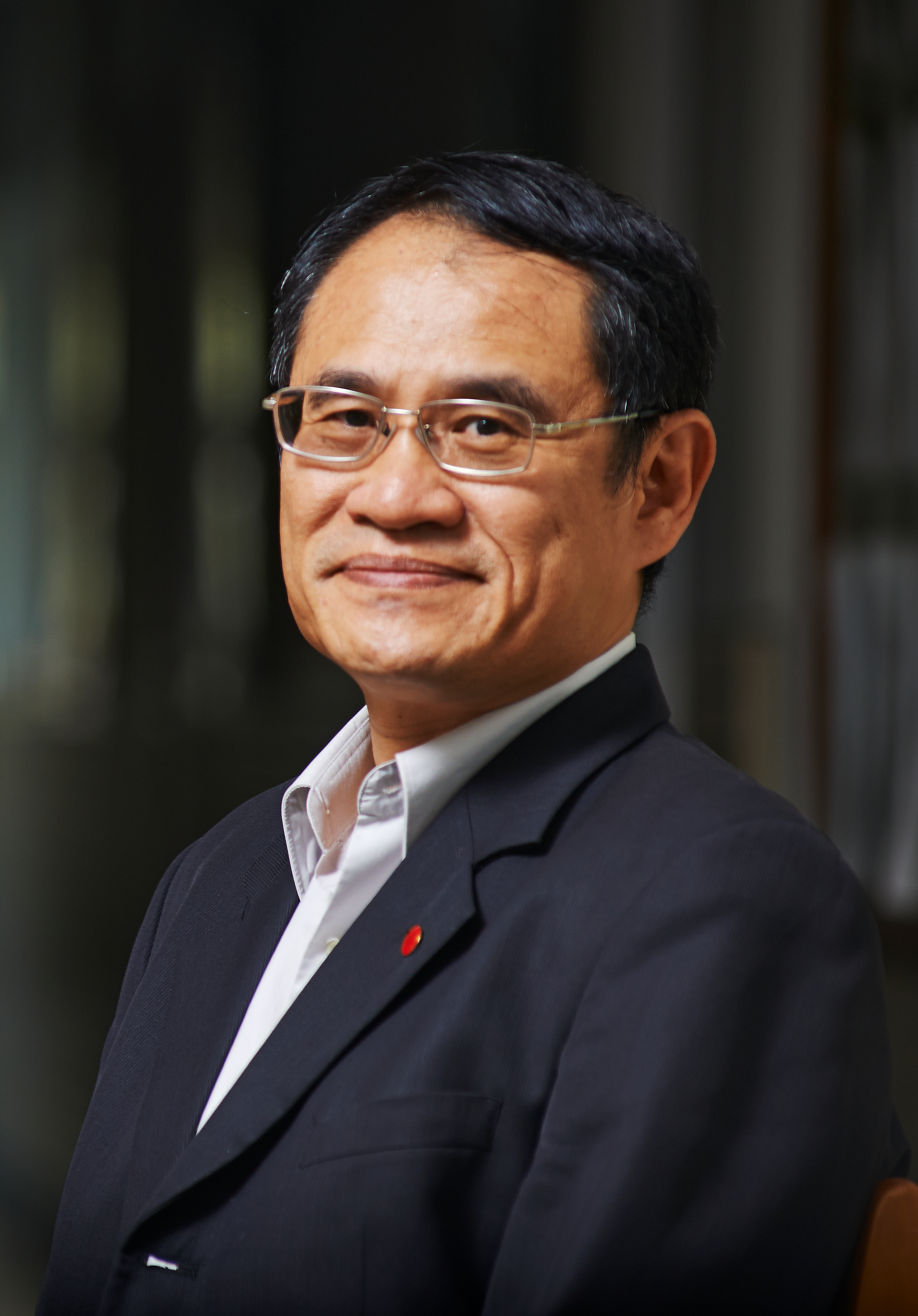
Faa-Jeng Lin
Life Fellow of Institute of Electrical and Electronics Engineers (IEEE)

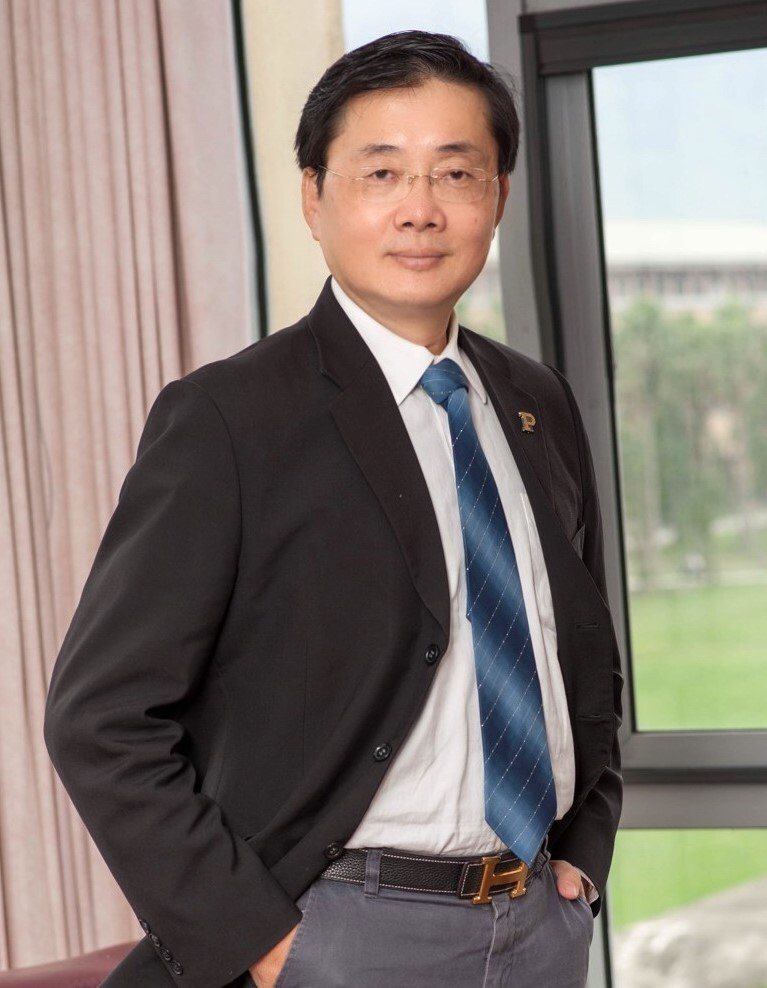
Han-Chieh Chao
Fellow of Institution of Engineering and Technology (IET) and British Computer Society (BCS)

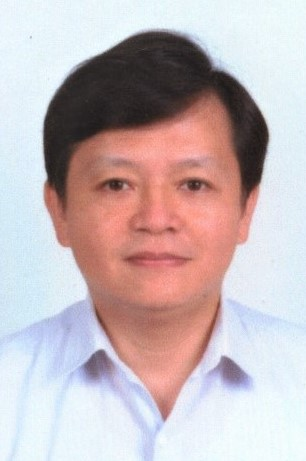
Shinfeng D. Lin
Fellow of Institution of Engineering and Technology (IET)

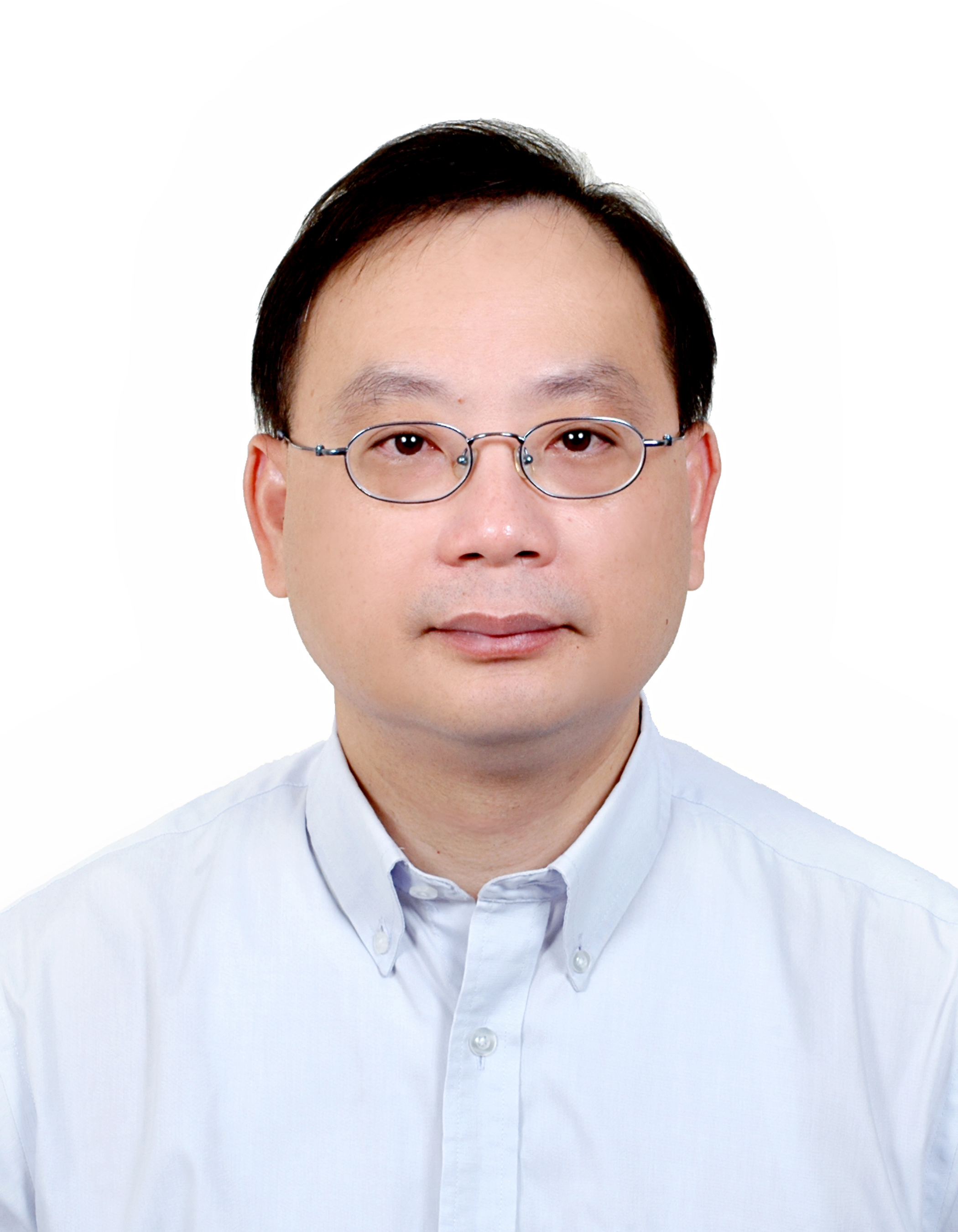
Ching-Nung Yang
Fellow of Institution of Engineering and Technology (IET)

== See also ==
- NDHU College of Science and Engineering
