= Therapeutic use exemption =

Document permitting athletes to take prohibited drugs

A therapeutic use exemption (TUE), also known as a temporary use exemption, is a term created in 1991 and refers to an official medical document. The document gives an athlete permission to take a medication listed on the World Anti-Doping Agency’s (WADA) Prohibited List, normally prohibited because its use would be considered a performance enhancing drug.

An example of a TUE is the World Anti-Doping Agency's exemption for testosterone replacement therapy. The average for a normal functioning male is a 1:1 ratio, but WADA allows up to a 4:1 ratio without testing positive for elevated testosterone. Mixed martial arts do not have as stringent anti-doping regulations as most other sports. The Journal of Legal Medicine quotes Dr. Johnny Benjamin, a medical journalist, as stating that in regards to TUEs in mixed martial arts, “TRT is far too easily abused”. In 2017, the Australian and New Zealand Sports Law Journal referred to the abuse of TUEs as “The Legal Dope”.

In 2016, Russian cyberespionage group Fancy Bear hacked into WADA's database and exfiltrated information about TUEs granted to hundreds Olympic athletes from over 20 countries (other than Russia), raising concerns over the misuse of TUEs for cheating, including Bradley Wiggins using the corticosteroid triamcinolone acetonide in 2011, 2012, and 2013.

In a recent study, 51% of professional athletes interviewed believed that athletes within their sport had received an unnecessary TUE, and another study reported 40% of professional athletes interviewed distrusted the TUE system.

Abuse of TUEs happens for more than just steroids. Adderall pills were permitted by Major League Baseball and 85% of players used them as performance enhancing drugs until 2006. In that year, the organization banned “greenies” but started granting TUEs for the substance. In eight years, the percentage of MLB players with TUEs for Adderall increased from 3 percent to 14 percent, prompting concerns that the substance is again being abused as a performance enhancing drug.

In addition to steroids, insulin is a concern for cheating with TUEs. As the Cycling Independent Reform Commission’s 2015 report to the president states, “One team doctor stated that he believed the TUE system had been regularly abused, particularly as previously mentioned, in the area of corticoids. Today there appears to be concern among riders about the way in which TUEs are used for corticoids and insulin in particular, and the extent to which they are being abused”.
