= Technology mining =

Tech mining or technology mining refers to applying text mining methods to technical documents. For patent analysis purposes, it is named ‘patent mining’. Porter, as one of the pioneers in technology mining, defined ‘tech mining’ in his book as follows: “the application of text mining tools to science and technology information, informed by understanding of technological innovation processes.” Therefore, tech mining has two significant characteristics: 1) using ‘text mining tools’, 2) applying these tools to ‘technology management’. Also, technology mining can be considered as one of technology intelligence branches.

== Applications ==
Technology mining have many applications including R&D portfolio selection, R&D project initiation, new product development, strategic technology planning, technology roadmapping, etc. Tech miner should communicate closely with target users what technological issue they have, and how they want to address the issues. The number of published papers and the number of citations in technology mining area illustrates a hyperbolically progress; there is a jump in the number of publications after 2005 and a huge rise in the number of citations after 2012.
