= Manual of German Law =

The Manual of German Law is a two-volume work whose purpose, according to its Preface (2nd edition, 1968 & 1971), 'is to assist those who in the course of their legal practice require information on elementary aspects of German law.' The two volumes of the first edition appeared in 1950 and 1952, respectively, with the subtitle Handbook of the Federal Foreign Office of German Law, 'reflecting the sponsorship of the British Foreign Office.' The British Institute of International and Comparative Law sponsored the second edition, published by Oceana Publications. It appeared in two volumes in 1968 and 1971 as 'Comparative Law Series No. 14' in the proceedings of that organization. The publisher of the second edition was

== Use as law textbook ==
The principal author and editor of the Manual of German Law was Ernest Joseph Cohn. Cohn used the Manual of German Law as a textbook in classes he taught at University College London up his death in 1976. Martina Jabs has observed in her study Die Emigration deutscher Juristen nach Groẞbritannien that (as of 1999) the Manual continued to be 'suitable for teaching German law as well as comparative law'. 'The first edition was praised for the practical and less dogmatic presentation of German law'; 'the second edition was also designed for teaching'. Twenty years after Cohn’s death (1976), the lecture notes referred to the Manual as textbook material in the lecture series 'European Legal Studies' at University College London and in other lectures given by instructors in London and at Oxford University'.

== Contents ==
The first volume of the second edition of the Manual of German Law is divided into six chapters: 'General Introduction', 'General Part of the Civil Law', 'Law of Obligations', 'Law of Things', 'Law of Domestic Relations', and 'Law of Succession'. The first volume also contains an extensive 'Glossary of German Terms', with Appendix I explaining the working of the Grundbuch, the German Land Register. Appendix II provides a Bibliography which concentrates on literature published after 1945. The second volume of the edition is also divided into six chapters: ' Commercial Law', ' Conflict of Laws', ' Law of Civil Procedure', ' Law of Bankruptcy', ' Law of Nationality', and 'Two Aspects of East German Family Law'. The last chapter is subdivided into 'East German Law of Divorce' and 'East German Law of Conflict of Laws in the Field of Family Law'.

== Collaborating Authors ==
In the second edition, first volume, the British Institute of International and Comparative Law notes the editorial assistance of Wolfgang Zdzieblo; according to the Preface, composed by Cohn, he was Senior Research Officer at the British Institute of International and Comparative Law. The second volume attributes authorship of specific chapters to O.C. Giles, E.J. Cohn, M. Bohndorf and J. Tomass. O.C. Giles, 'Gray’s Inn, Barrister-at-Law' is named as the author of chapter 7, 'Commercial law'. Cohn authored Chapter 8 ‘Conflict of Laws’ and Chapter 9 ‘Law of Civil Procedure’. Michael T. Bohndorf authored Chapter 10 'Law of Bankruptcy' and Chapter 11 Law of Nationality.

== Reviews ==
The second edition was reviewed in 1972 by Hein Kötz. Kötz, the former Director of the Max Planck Institute for Comparative and International Private Law and a corresponding Fellow of the British Academy. The review was published in Rabel Journal of Comparative and International Private Law, vol. 36 n. 1, at pp. 215–219. 'Im ganzen gebührt dem Verfasser lebhafter Dank dafür, daß er das deutsche bürgerliche Recht in so gelungener Form der Englishschprachigen Juristenwelt vorgestellt und es damit auch den Komparatisten des Common Law leichter zugänglich gemacht hat'. / 'On the whole, the author deserves heartfelt thanks for presenting German civil law in such a successful form to the English-speaking legal world and, therefore, making German law more accessible to comparative studies of the Common Law.'

== Coverage ==
The scope of both editions of the Manual has received favourable scholarly notice. Referring to the second edition, Leonard J. Theberge, for whom the Leonard J. Theberge Award for Private International Law is named, reviewed the Manual in The International Lawyer Vol. 6 No. 3, July 1972 pp. 671–673 as follows: It is 'an extremely useful and well-written guide to the laws of Germany for both the practicing attorney and the student of comparative law. The Manual is a revised edition of a work that has been a standard reference for more than twenty years. Its purpose, which it serves admirably, is to be source of information on German law for those who require such information. It is highly recommended to those who have a need to refer to German law.'

== Reviews ==
The 'Manual of German Law' (second edition) was reviewed by de:Hein Kötz. Kötz was the former Director of the Max Planck Institute for Comparative and International Private Law and is a corresponding Fellow of the British Academy. The review was published in 1972 in The Rabel Journal of Comparative and International Private Law.'Im ganzen gebührt dem Verfasser lebhafter Dank dafür, daß er das deutsche bürgerliche Recht in so gelungener Form der Englishschprachigen Juristenwelt vorgestellt und es damit auch den Komparatisten des Common Law leichter zugänglich gemacht hat'. ('On the whole, the author deserves heartfelt thanks for presenting German civil law in such a successful form to the English-speaking legal world and, therefore, making German law more accessible to comparative studies of the Common Law.')
