= Jean-Michel Billaut =

French systems analyst and internet personality (1945–2025)

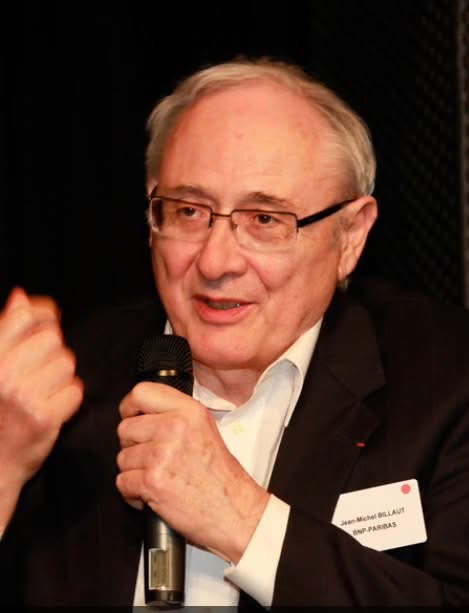
- Billaut in 2010
- Born: 29 April 1945
- Died: 11 January 2025 (aged 79)
- Occupations: Systems analyst Internet personality

Jean-Michel Billaut (29 April 1945 – 11 January 2025) was a French systems analyst and internet personality.

== Life and career ==
Born on 29 April 1945, Billaut was working as an analyst for Compagnie Bancaire when he borrowed a Minitel from the Direction générale des Télécommunications. In 1978, he created the Atelier Compagnie Bancaire, a system for monitoring technology intelligence and analysis of emerging technologies. In 1983, Cetelem began using the Minitel and six years later Billaut's system accounted for 35% of the market for payments using the device. The system later became known as L'Atelier BNP Paribas, and it established itself in the United States in 2007 and launched a website dedicated to technology news.

Billaut helped launch numerous websites in the 1990s and was nicknamed an internet "guru". Wired magazine wrote an extensive article on him in 2000, calling him an "e-grandpa". In the early 2000s, he became an advocate of the rapid development of high-speed internet access, predicting that countries would gain notoriety for their bandwidth speeds. In 2000, he was named a Knight of the Legion of Honour. He also gained fame from his blog billautshows, where he published interviews with French internet personalities. In October 2011, he received a Hub Award at the annual Hub Forum. For several years, he participated in conferences on the digital economy, notably taking part in the Canal+ forumThe end of work: how digital will change everything by 2050". In 2016, he took part in the LaPrimaire.org primary, which sought to nominate a candidate for the 2017 French presidential election, placing 10th.

Billaut died on 11 January 2025, at the age of 79.
