= MIT Tech Talk =

US university newspaper

MIT Tech Talk (abbreviated Tech Talk) was the Massachusetts Institute of Technology's official newspaper from February 1957 until September 2009, when it ceased publication. It was written and published by the MIT News Office, both in print and online, with print copies distributed throughout campus free of charge. The publication schedule was roughly weekly, with an issue out most Wednesdays during the academic term.

It was occasionally parodied by an unauthorized publication called Tich Tolk.

== See also ==
- MIT News, MIT's official online news source since 1994.
