= Higher Education Evaluation and Accreditation Council of Taiwan =

The Higher Education Evaluation and Accreditation Council of Taiwan (HEEACT; Chinese: 財團法人高等教育評鑑中心基金會) is a Taiwanese nonprofit organization founded in May 2005. HEEACT applied for ISO certification in July 2008 and received certification on 4 February 2009.

Until 2012, HEEACT published the annual Performance Ranking of Scientific Papers for World Universities, a bibliometrics based ranking of research universities. The performance measures were composed of eight indicators (11 years articles, Current articles, 11 years citations, Current citations, Average citations, H-index, Highly cited papers, and High Impact journal articles) representing three different criteria of scientific paper performance: research productivity, research impact, and research excellence. The objective indicators used in this ranking system were designed measure both long-term and short-term research performance of each university. The ranking started in 2007.
