= MIT News =

News publication of the Massachusetts Institute of Technology

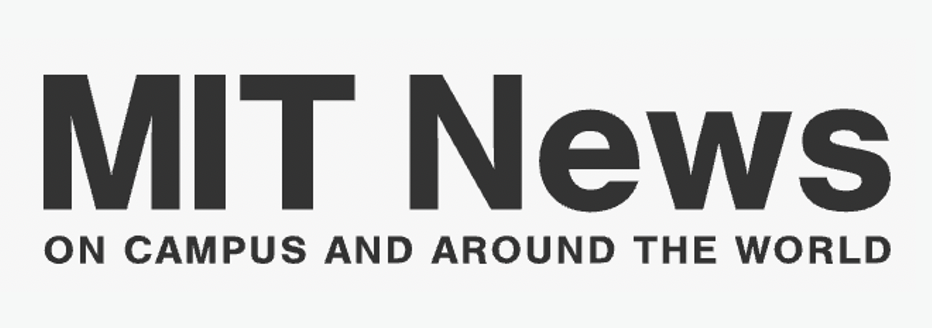
- Type: Newsletter
- Owner: Massachusetts Institute of Technology
- Founded: 1994
- Language: English
- Website: news.mit.edu

MIT News is an official news publication service of the Massachusetts Institute of Technology. As of 2021, it includes a website; a daily newsletter, the MIT Daily; and a weekly newsletter, the MIT Weekly. It is edited by the MIT News Office. It started publication in September 1994.

== See also ==
- MIT Tech Talk, MIT weekly official newspaper from 1957 to 2009
