= International Journal of Image and Graphics =

- Discipline: Computer Science
- Language: English

Publication details
- Publisher: World Scientific (Singapore)

Standard abbreviations
- ISO 4: Int. J. Image Graph.

Indexing
- ISSN: 0219-4678 (print); 1793-6756 (web)

Links
- Journal homepage

The International Journal of Image and Graphics was established in 2001 and covers image and graphics technologies and systems. It is published by World Scientific and provides "a central forum for scientists, researchers, engineers and vendors from different disciplines to exchange ideas, identify problems, investigate relevant issues, share common interests, explore new directions, and initiate possible collaborative research and system development". The journal covers topics such as image analysis and understanding, Graphics Modeling, Multimedia Systems and Graphics Applications.

The current editor in chief is David Zhang (Department of Computing, Hong Kong Polytechnic University).
