= International Journal of Healthcare Information Systems and Informatics =

- Discipline: Informatics
- Language: English
- Edited by: Qiang Cheng, Joseph Tan

Publication details
- History: 2006–present
- Publisher: IGI Global
- Frequency: Quarterly
- Open access: Yes
- License: CC BY 4.0

Standard abbreviations
- ISO 4: Int. J. Healthc. Inf. Syst. Inform.

Indexing
- ISSN: 1555-3396 (print); 1555-340X (web)
- LCCN: 2005212224
- OCLC no.: 939124381

Links
- Journal homepage; Online archive

The International Journal of Healthcare Information Systems and Informatics is a quarterly peer-reviewed scientific journal which publishes research articles and reviews about the innovations and applications of new technologies in the area of information systems and informatics in the healthcare industry. The journal was established in 2006 and is published by IGI Global. The editors-in-chief are Qiang Cheng (University of Kentucky) and Joseph Tan (McMaster University).

== Abstracting and indexing ==
The journal is abstracted and indexed in:

- Emerging Sources Citation Index
- EBSCO databases
- Ei Compendex
- Inspec
- ProQuest databases
- Scopus
