= Journal of International Management =

The Journal of International Management is a quarterly peer-reviewed academic journal covering research on international business and management. It was established in 1995 and the editor-in-chief is Masaaki Kotabe (Temple University). The journal is published by Elsevier and according to the Journal Citation Reports, the journal has a 2022 impact factor of 6.1.
