= Technology intelligence =

Technology Intelligence (TI) is an activity that enables companies to identify the technological opportunities and threats that could affect the future growth and survival of their business. It aims to capture and disseminate the technological information needed for strategic planning and decision making. As technology life cycles shorten and business become more globalized having effective TI capabilities is becoming increasingly important. Technology Intelligence (TI) is a structured approach that helps organizations identify, analyze, and act upon technological opportunities and threats that shape their competitive landscape and future growth. By systematically gathering and interpreting technological data, TI supports strategic decision-making and innovation management.

Technological data sources are:

- Patents
- Science articles
- Clinical trials
- Pre-prints
- Books

In the United States, Project Socrates identified the exploitation of technology as the most effective foundation for decision making for the complete set of functions within the private and public sectors that determine competitiveness.

The Centre for Technology Management has defined 'technology intelligence' as "the capture and delivery of technological information as part of the process whereby an organization develops an awareness of technological threats and opportunities."

The Internet has contributed to the growth of data sources for technology intelligence. Technology intelligence gives organizations the ability to be aware of technology threats and opportunities. It is important for companies and businesses to be able to identify emerging technologies in form of opportunities and threats and how this can affect their business. Technology intelligence has grown as a discipline since the 1990s, including because it has become easier and cheaper to acquire and store data from different sources that can be analyzed and used in different industries. Technology intelligence can accelerate business growth by shortening the time between data acquisition and decision-making. There are several tools called text mining and tech-pioneer that make the technology intelligence process actionable and effective. This process consists of 4 steps: organizing the competitive intelligence effort, collecting the information, analyzing the information and disseminating the results. Although this process is very beneficial to organizations, there are some challenges such as communication and interpreting the results the process provides.

Artificial intelligence has become useful in technology intelligence, enabling automated analysis of data sets, pattern recognition in trends, and predictive modeling for emerging technologies. Machine learning applications can facilitate context search through NLP, patent analysis, and competitive landscape mapping at scale.

== Historic Development ==
Technology intelligence is not new but is more important now that organizations and societies are being disrupted by the shift to an information and networking-based economy. A subset of competitive intelligence, there are different stages of the evolution process. Between the 1970s and 1980s, companies started adopting technology intelligence processes but were not successful. This failure still causes uncertainty on how companies could adopt these practices, but in later years interest in technology intelligence processes grew. In the 1980s, the work of Michael Porter on strategic management renewed this interest. In the 1990s, competitive intelligence grew with numerous publications on the topic, government efforts to encourage competitive intelligence and the origination of competitive intelligence courses and programs in universities.

The first generation of technology intelligence occurred when there was no long-term strategic framework for research and development (R&D) management. A number of inefficient innovations were created, due to the fact that there wasn't much coordination between the central research department and their technology needs. Technology monitoring was introduced to the central research department but still, there were errors. The recommendations were not efficient and their presentation was poor and this didn't do much for the resource allocation process.

The second generation of technology intelligence tried to strengthen the link between companies and R&D management by offering short term technological needs but this was not enough as the corporate strategy did not offer long term guidance. When it came to emerging technologies, these could not be easily implemented because they had not adequately planned and were not receptive to recommendations. The technology intelligence processes in this generation were focused on customers in the short term run. Information was collected, analyzed and organized in a controlled manner based on the technology intelligence process of the researcher and this limited the efficiency of the technology intelligence specialists.

In the third generation of technology intelligence, the corporate and technology management both decide the strategy and content of R&D. The insufficient information about the knowledge of the market in the future is used as an opportunity to introduce long term innovations to help the company grow and take advantage of opportunities. This strengthens the company's learning ability as all necessary parties are involved. This differs from the previous generations as technology intelligence positions have a coordination role and is decentralized. This is the stage that only a few companies have moved to and others are gradually doing the same.

== Tools ==
The key to actionable technology is being able to properly implement the use of IT tools to collect and perform analysis on relevant data. The use of open innovation is a good way for businesses to take advantage of technology intelligence. When people within an organization can contribute technologies and ideas, it allows for increased growth. The use of these IT tools like text mining make technology intelligence more efficient and actionable. These tools are very important in planning for technology development by providing frameworks to aid the technology intelligence process. A common tool used is text mining. This tool obtains information from a company's data and analyzes and identifies patterns that will be beneficial to them. The benefit of text mining is that it has a keyword-based morphology analysis that allows you assess the economic and technological value of future technology. Another tool used is Tech-Pioneer. This tool identifies technology opportunities systematically by using a computerized procedure to identify keywords and analyze the architecture and framework of technologies. These tools are mostly used to provide numerous possibilities of future technologies and not necessarily predict the future. These scenarios that the tools provide is pivotal in the technology intelligence process. Scenario planning is also a part of the technology intelligence process. It improves the decision-making process and creates images of how the future might evolve which allows companies to take advantage of opportunities to grow. These scenarios can also identify possible threats.

== Process ==
The technology intelligence process consists of 4 steps:

- Planning, organizing and directing the competitive intelligence effort,
- Collecting intelligence information,
- Analyzing the data,
- Disseminating the results of intelligence for action.

Planning involves the company deciding to pursue technology-based opportunities. Collecting information involves a number of techniques used to gather insights from data. The third step involves identifying these technological opportunities from the results. The last step involves putting the results into action and taking advantage of the knowledge the process has provided.

Technology intelligence is important to technology-based companies. It identifies technology opportunities by generating insights that can affect revenues and profits. It can result in a shift in strategy and improve the quality of a business' products and services. The process also deals with large volumes of data and generates information that humans cannot produce.

== Challenges ==
A challenge of technology intelligence is that there is limited conformity between the analysis generated and the time of the planning. There can also be some difficulties in communication and realization of results. Even when a firm has good technology intelligence, it can be problematic to actually get the information discovered to decision makers. Contemporary challenges are:

- Information Overload: The exponential growth of technological information creates new challenges in filtering and prioritizing relevant intelligence.
- Speed of Change: Accelerating technological development cycles require more agile and responsive intelligence processes.
- Interdisciplinary Complexity: Modern technologies often span multiple disciplines, requiring more sophisticated analytical frameworks.
- Cybersecurity Concerns: Technology intelligence activities face increasing cybersecurity risks as they rely more heavily on digital platforms and data sources.

== See also ==
- Competitive intelligence
- Technology Scouting
