= Machine Learning and Knowledge Extraction =

- Discipline: Machine learning, artificial intelligence, data science
- Language: English
- Edited by: Andreas Holzinger

Publication details
- History: 2019–present
- Publisher: MDPI (Switzerland)
- Frequency: Quarterly
- Open access: Yes
- License: Creative Commons Attribution License
- Impact factor: 6.0 (2023)

Standard abbreviations
- ISO 4: Mach. Learn. Knowl. Extr.

Indexing
- ISSN: 2504-4990

Links
- Journal homepage

Machine Learning and Knowledge Extraction (MAKE) is a peer-reviewed open-access scientific journal covering research on machine learning, knowledge extraction and related areas of data-driven artificial intelligence. It is published by MDPI and was launched in 2019 with Andreas Holzinger as founding Editor-in-Chief.

The journal publishes research articles, reviews, tutorials and short notes spanning topics such as data ecosystems, interactive and automated machine learning, explainable AI, privacy, graph learning and topological data analysis

== Abstracting and indexing ==
The journal is abstracted and indexed in several databases, for example in:

- DOAJ
- Emerging Sources Citation Index
- Scopus

According to the Journal Citation Reports, the journal has a 2024 impact factor of 6.0.
