= Performance Ranking of Scientific Papers for World Universities =

Ranking of world universities

The Performance Ranking of Scientific Papers for World Universities (NTU Rankings) is a ranking of world universities compiled by National Taiwan University annually since 2012.

This publication ranks world universities by a certain criteria of scientific paper volume, impact, and performance output. The ranking was originally published from 2007 to 2011 by the Higher Education Evaluation and Accreditation Council of Taiwan and has been published since 2012 by the National Taiwan University. It uses bibliometric methods to analyze and rank the scientific paper performance. In addition to the overall ranking, it includes a list of the top universities in six fields and fourteen subjects.

The rankings were introduced in 2007. The original ranking methodology favored toward universities with medical schools. In 2008, HEEACT began publishing a "Field Based Ranking" including six fields: agriculture and environmental sciences (AGE), clinical medicine (MED), engineering, computing, and technology (ENG), life sciences (LIFE), natural sciences (SCI), and social sciences (SOC).

In 2010, HEEACT began publishing subject rankings in fields of various field of science and technology. Science fields are divided into physics, chemistry, mathematics, and geosciences. Technology fields are split up into electrical engineering, computer science, mechanical engineering, chemical engineering (including energy and fuels), materials science, and civil engineering (including environmental engineering).

HEEACT ended the Performance Ranking of Scientific Papers for World Universities Project in 2012. Due to disagreement about ranking results, the Taiwanese education authorities announced that the government would no longer support the Higher Education Evaluation and Accreditation Council of Taiwan to do this ranking.

== Methodology ==
The HEEACT rankings used the following criteria:

- Research productivity (weighed 20%)—The number of published articles of the last 11 years (10%) and the number of articles of the current year (10%).
- Research impact (weighed 30%)—Number of citations of the last 11 years (10%), the number of citations of the last two years (10%), and the average number of citations of the last 11 years (10%).
- Research excellence (weighed 40%)—The h-index of the last two years (20%), the number of highly cited papers (15%), and the number of articles of the current year in high-impact journals (15%).

Quantitative data were drawn from Science Citation Index (SCI) and Social Sciences Citation Index (SSCI). The data were normalized by faculty number to account for different institution sizes. The indicators used in this methodology highly emphasized research quality (80% of the performance score) and short-term research performance (55% of the score).

The current NTU rankings use the following criteria:

- Research productivity (weighed 25%)—The number of published articles of the last 11 years (10%) and the number of articles of the current year (15%).
- Research impact (weighed 35%)—Number of citations of the last 11 years (15%), the number of citations of the last two years (10%), and the average number of citations of the last 11 years (10%).
- Research excellence (weighed 40%)—The h-index of the last two years (10%), the number of highly cited papers (15%), and the number of articles of the current year in high-impact journals (15%).

== HEEACT World University Rankings (Top 50) ==
2024	2020	2010	Institution	Country
1	1	1	Harvard University	United States
2	2	2	Stanford University	United States
3	5	17	University College London	United Kingdom
4	3	9	University of Toronto	Canada
5	6	10	University of Oxford	United Kingdom
6	4	3	Johns Hopkins University	United States
7	17	114	Tsinghua University	China
8	30	145	Zhejiang University	China
9	11	16	University of Cambridge	United Kingdom
10	8	7	Massachusetts Institute of Technology	United States
11	8	4	University of Washington	United States
12	25	183	Shanghai Jiao Tong University	China
13	9	8	University of Michigan	United States
14	14	21	Imperial College London	United Kingdom
15	42		Paris Cité University	France
16	10	11	University of Pennsylvania	United States
17	13	13	Columbia University	United States
18	29	124	Peking University	China
19	12	5	University of California, Los Angeles	United States
20	19	18	Yale University	United States
21	38	84	National University of Singapore	Singapore
22	18	12	University of California, San Diego	United States
23	15	15	University of California, San Francisco	United States
24	23	43	University of Melbourne	Australia
25	21	57	ETH Zurich	Switzerland
26	28	22	Cornell University	United States
27	31	69	University of Sydney	Australia
28	22	53	University of Copenhagen	Denmark
29	63	64	University of Amsterdam	Netherlands
30	16	6	University of California, Berkeley	United States
31			Paris-Saclay University	France
32	56	332	Sun Yat-sen University	China
33	45	130	Monash University	Australia
34	20	19	Duke University	United States
35	26		Sorbonne University	France
36	27	27	Northwestern University	United States
37	33	32	University of British Columbia	Canada
38	67	473	Huazhong University of Science and Technology	China
39	62	230	Fudan University	China
40	39	95	University of Queensland	Australia
41	51	145	University of New South Wales	Australia
42	40	46	Mayo Clinic College of Medicine	United States
43	44	55	King's College London	United Kingdom
44	59	204	University of Science and Technology of China	China
45	32	25	Washington University in St. Louis	United States
46	37	14	University of Tokyo	Japan
47	68	77	KU Leuven	Belgium
48	34	23	University of Pittsburgh	United States
49	53	243	Nanyang Technological University	Singapore
50	88	565	Central South University	China

== HEEACT World University Rankings (Top 20 by field) ==
=== Agriculture ===
2024	University	Country
01	Wageningen University	Netherlands
02	China Agricultural University	China
03	ETH Zurich	Switzerland
04	Zhejiang University	China
05	Northwest A&F University	China
06	University of Queensland	Australia
07	University of California- Davis	US
08	University of Florida	US
09	University of São Paulo	Brazil
10	Cornell University	US
11	Nanjing Agricultural University	China
12	Tsinghua University	China
13	University of Montpellier	France
14	Ghent University	Belgium
15	University of Copenhagen	Denmark
16	Swedish University of Agricultural Sciences	Sweden
17	The University of British Columbia	Canada
18	Peking University	China
19	University of Western Australia	Australia
20	University of California- Berkeley	US

=== Clinical Medicine ===
2024	University	Country
01	Harvard University	US
02	University of Toronto	Canada
03	Johns Hopkins University	US
04	University College London	United Kingdom
05	University of Pennsylvania	US
06	Mayo Clinic College of Medicine	US
07	University of California- San Francisco	US
08	Stanford University	US
09	Paris Cité University	France
10	University of Washington- Seattle	US
11	University of Oxford	United Kingdom
12	University of Michigan- Ann Arbor	US
13	University of Amsterdam	Netherlands
14	Yale University	US
15	Imperial College London	United Kingdom
16	Duke University	US
17	King's College London	United Kingdom
18	Columbia University	US
19	University of California- Los Angeles	US
20	Karolinska Institutet	Sweden

=== Engineering ===
2024	University	Country
01	Tsinghua University	China
02	Zhejiang University	China
03	Harbin Institute of Technology	China
04	Shanghai Jiao Tong University	China
05	Nanyang Technological University	Singapore
06	Xi'an Jiaotong University	China
07	Huazhong University of Science and Technology	China
08	University of Science and Technology of China	China
09	Massachusetts Institute of Technology	US
10	Tianjin University	China
11	Southeast University	China
12	Central South University	China
13	South China University of Technology	China
14	Northwestern Polytechnical University	China
15	Chongqing University	China
16	Tongji University	China
17	Georgia Institute of Technology	US
18	Beijing Institute of Technology	China
19	Stanford University	US
20	Beijing Institute of Technology	China

=== Life Sciences ===
2024	University	Country
01	Harvard University	US
02	Massachusetts Institute of Technology	US
03	Stanford University	US
04	University of Oxford	United Kingdom
05	University College London	United Kingdom
06	University of Cambridge	United Kingdom
07	University of California- San Francisco	US
08	Johns Hopkins University	US
09	University of Pennsylvania	US
10	Zhejiang University	China
11	University of California, San Diego	US
12	University of Toronto	Canada
13	Shanghai Jiao Tong University	China
14	Paris Cité University	France
15	Fudan University	China
16	University of Washington, Seattle	US
17	University of Copenhagen	Denmark
18	Sun Yat-sen University	China
19	Yale University	US
20	Cornell University	US

=== Natural Sciences ===
2024	University	Country
01	ETH Zurich	Switzerland
02	Harvard University	US
03	Tsinghua University	China
04	Massachusetts Institute of Technology	US
05	University of California- Berkeley	US
06	Stanford University	US
07	Paris-Saclay University	France
08	California Institute of Technology	US
09	University of Cambridge	United Kingdom
10	Sorbonne University	France
11	University of Science and Technology of China	China
12	The University of Tokyo	Japan
13	University of Oxford	United Kingdom
14	Zhejiang University	China
15	Peking University	China
16	University College London	United Kingdom
17	Paris Cité University	France
18	Paris Sciences et Lettres University	France
19	National University of Singapore	Singapore
20	Nanyang Technological University	Singapore

=== Social Sciences ===
2024	University	Country
01	Harvard University	US
02	University College London	United Kingdom
03	University of Toronto	Canada
04	University of Oxford	United Kingdom
05	Stanford University	US
06	Columbia University	US
07	University of Michigan- Ann Arbor	US
08	Johns Hopkins University	US
09	Monash University	Australia
10	University of Cambridge	United Kingdom
11	University of Washington- Seattle	US
12	University of Amsterdam	Netherlands
13	University of Sydney	Australia
14	University of Melbourne	Australia
15	University of Pennsylvania	US
16	University of North Carolina- Chapel Hill	US
17	Yale University	US
18	University of Queensland	Australia
19	University of California - Berkeley	US
20	University of British Columbia	Canada

== HEEACT World University Rankings (Top 20 by subject) ==
=== Physics (includes Astronomy and Space Science) ===
2010	University	Country
01	University of California- Berkeley	US
02	California Institute of Technology	US
03	Massachusetts Institute of Technology	US
04	The University of Tokyo	Japan
05	University of Cambridge	United Kingdom
06	Princeton University	US
07	Stanford University	US
08	Harvard University	US
09	Pennsylvania State University- University Park	US
10	University of California- Los Angeles	US
11	University of Oxford	United Kingdom
12	Johns Hopkins University	US
13	University of California- Santa Barbara	US
14	University of Maryland- College Park	US
15	University of Paris XI: Sud	France
16	The University of Chicago	US
17	The University of Chicago	US
18	Tohoku University	Japan
19	University of Arizona	US
20	Cornell University	US

=== Chemistry ===
2010	University	Country
01	University of California- Berkeley	US
02	The University of Tokyo	Japan
03	Massachusetts Institute of Technology	US
04	Kyoto University	Japan
05	Northwestern University	US
06	Harvard University	US
07	Osaka University	Japan
08	Stanford University	US
09	University of Cambridge	United Kingdom
10	Swiss Federal Institute of Technology- Zurich	Switzerland
11	Tohoku University	Japan
12	University of Illinois- Urbana-Champaign	US
13	Georgia Institute of Technology	US
14	California Institute of Technology	US
15	Swiss Federal Institute of Technology- Lausanne	Switzerland
16	Tsinghua University	China
17	Peking University	China
18	University of Michigan- Ann Arbor	US
19	University of California- Los Angeles	US
20	Seoul National University	South Korea

=== Mathematics ===
2010	University	Country
01	Stanford University	US
02	University of California- Berkeley	US
03	Harvard University	US
04	Princeton University	US
05	University of California- Los Angeles	US
06	University of Minnesota- Twin Cities	US
07	University of Michigan- Ann Arbor	US
08	University of Washington- Seattle	US
09	University of Paris VI: Pierre et Marie Curie	France
10	Massachusetts Institute of Technology	US
11	National University of Singapore	Singapore
12	University of Wisconsin- Madison	US
13	University of Oxford	United Kingdom
14	Lomonosov Moscow State University	Russia
15	The University of Chicago	US
16	University of Paris XI: Sud	France
17	New York University	US
18	Texas A&M University- College Station	US
19	California Institute of Technology	US
20	Columbia University	US

=== Geosciences ===
2010	University	Country
01	University of Colorado- Boulder	US
02	University of Washington- Seattle	US
03	California Institute of Technology	US
04	Swiss Federal Institute of Technology- Zurich	Switzerland
05	University of California- Berkeley	US
06	Columbia University	US
07	Massachusetts Institute of Technology	US
08	University of California- San Diego	US
09	University of Hawaii	US
10	Harvard University	US
11	The University of Tokyo	Japan
12	University of Maryland- College Park	US
13	University of Arizona	US
14	University of Wisconsin- Madison	US
15	University of Cambridge	United Kingdom
16	Colorado State University	US
17	University of Paris VI: Pierre et Marie Curie	France
18	The Australian National University	Australia
19	University of California- Los Angeles	US
20	University of Oxford	United Kingdom

=== Electrical Engineering ===
2010	University	Country
01	Massachusetts Institute of Technology	US
02	University of California- Berkeley	US
03	National University of Singapore	Singapore
04	Stanford University	US
05	Georgia Institute of Technology	US
06	Nanyang Technological University	Singapore
07	University of Michigan- Ann Arbor	US
08	University of Illinois- Urbana-Champaign	US
09	University of California- Los Angeles	US
10	Tsinghua University	China
11	Harvard University	US
12	National Cheng Kung University	ROC(Taiwan)
13	University of California- San Diego	US
14	California Institute of Technology	US
15	Purdue University- West Lafayette	US
16	National Taiwan University	ROC(Taiwan)
17	National Chiao Tung University	ROC(Taiwan)
18	Swiss Federal Institute of Technology- Zurich	Switzerland
19	University of Toronto	Canada
20	City University of Hong Kong	Hong Kong

=== Computer Science ===
2010	University	Country
01	Massachusetts Institute of Technology	US
02	Stanford University	US
03	University of California- Berkeley	US
04	Harvard University	US
05	University of Illinois- Urbana-Champaign	US
06	National University of Singapore	Singapore
07	Carnegie Mellon University	US
08	Nanyang Technological University	Singapore
09	Princeton University	US
10	University of California- San Diego	US
11	Swiss Federal Institute of Technology- Zurich	Switzerland
12	Technion- Israel Institute of Technology	Israel
13	University of Southern California	US
14	Georgia Institute of Technology	US
15	City University of Hong Kong	Hong Kong
16	Tsinghua University	China
17	University of California- Los Angeles	US
18	University of Maryland- College Park	US
19	National Cheng Kung University	ROC(Taiwan)
20	University of Minnesota- Twin Cities	US

=== Civil Engineering (including Environmental Engineering) ===
2010	University	Country
01	University of California- Berkeley	US
02	Swiss Federal Institute of Technology- Zurich	Switzerland
03	Hong Kong Polytechnic University	Hong Kong
04	Technical University of Denmark	Denmark
05	Delft University of Technology	Netherlands
06	University of California- Davis	US
07	Imperial College London	United Kingdom
08	University of Queensland	Australia
09	University of Toronto	Canada
10	National Taiwan University	ROC(Taiwan)
11	Tsinghua University	China
12	Georgia Institute of Technology	US
13	Zhejiang University	China
14	Stanford University	US
15	National Cheng Kung University	ROC(Taiwan)
16	Texas A&M University- College Station	US
17	Pennsylvania State University- University Park	US
18	University of Waterloo	Canada
19	Arizona State University	US
20	The University of Texas- Austin	US

=== Mechanical Engineering ===
2010	University	Country
01	Massachusetts Institute of Technology	US
02	Stanford University	US
03	University of Illinois- Urbana-Champaign	US
04	University of Michigan- Ann Arbor	US
05	Georgia Institute of Technology	US
06	University of Cambridge	United Kingdom
07	University of California- Berkeley	US
08	Shanghai Jiao Tong University	China
09	Cornell University	US
10	Imperial College London	United Kingdom
11	Tsinghua University	China
12	Princeton University	US
13	National University of Singapore	Singapore
14	Purdue University- West Lafayette	US
15	Delft University of Technology	Netherlands
16	California Institute of Technology	US
17	Seoul National University	South Korea
18	Northwestern University	US
19	Harvard University	US
20	Pennsylvania State University- University Park	US

=== Chemical Engineering (including Energy & Fuels) ===
2010	University	Country
01	Kyoto University	Japan
02	Pennsylvania State University- University Park	US
03	Technical University of Denmark	Denmark
04	National University of Singapore	Singapore
05	The University of New South Wales	Australia
06	Seoul National University	South Korea
07	Eindhoven University of Technology	Netherlands
08	Tsinghua University	China
09	Imperial College London	United Kingdom
10	Zhejiang University	China
11	Carnegie Mellon University	US
12	Tokyo Institute of Technology	Japan
13	University of Science and Technology of China	China
14	Georgia Institute of Technology	US
15	Swiss Federal Institute of Technology- Zurich	Switzerland
16	Shanghai Jiao Tong University	China
17	National Taiwan University	ROC(Taiwan)
18	Tianjin University	China
19	Korea Advanced Institute of Science and Technology	South Korea
20	The University of Texas- Austin	US

=== Materials Science ===
2010	University	Country
01	Massachusetts Institute of Technology	US
02	Tohoku University	Japan
03	National University of Singapore	Singapore
04	University of California- Berkeley	US
05	Tsinghua University	China
06	University of Cambridge	United Kingdom
07	Northwestern University	US
08	Seoul National University	South Korea
09	Harvard University	US
10	Georgia Institute of Technology	US
11	University of California- Santa Barbara	US
12	Pennsylvania State University- University Park	US
13	The University of Tokyo	Japan
14	Nanyang Technological University	Singapore
15	Stanford University	US
16	University of Washington- Seattle	US
17	Osaka University	Japan
18	University of Michigan- Ann Arbor	US
19	University of Illinois- Urbana-Champaign	US
20	Imperial College London	United Kingdom

== Commentary ==
The Australian higher education indicated that the 2007 performance ranking of scientific papers for world universities produced by HEEACT is a useful addition to the present world university ranks because of its rigorous method and robust results, which are made possible by its more modest scope. There are more comments on the HEEACT rankings. The senior research fellow of Institute of Scientific and Technical Information of China, Wu Yi-shan, claimed that the HEEACT ranking is the best ranking system he has ever seen. Wu indicated that the HEEACT ranking considers both long-term and short-term performance of a university. The idea of combining long-term and short-term ranking indicators is a pioneering thought. Richard Holmes posted on University Ranking Watch and noted: "Although the Shanghai rankings show a high correlation with other rankings (based on a tiny sample of US universities) the HEEACT rankings from Taiwan do somewhat better." Vice-president Research for the University of Toronto, Professor Paul Young, remarked that "the HEEACT rankings are relatively new, they are an important and methodologically robust measure of the quantity and quality of research performed by universities around the world." The dean of academic affairs at National Taiwan University, Chiang Been-Huang, stated that "2009 Performance Ranking of Scientific Papers for World Universities by HEEACT are conducted based on objective figures."

== See also ==
- College and university rankings
- Academic Ranking of World Universities
- Times Higher Education World University Rankings
- QS World University Rankings
- Webometrics Ranking of World Universities
- Global University Ranking
