= Journal of Legal Medicine =

- Discipline: Legal medicine
- Language: English
- Edited by: Leslie E. Wolf

Publication details
- History: 1979-present
- Publisher: Taylor & Francis
- Frequency: Quarterly
- Impact factor: 0.417 (2019)

Standard abbreviations
- Bluebook: J. Legal Med.
- ISO 4: J. Leg. Med.

Indexing
- ISSN: 0194-7648 (print); 1521-057X (web)

Links
- Journal homepage; Online access

The Journal of Legal Medicine is a quarterly peer-reviewed academic journal covering legal medicine and medical law. It was established in 1979 and is published by Taylor & Francis on behalf of the American College of Legal Medicine, of which it is the official journal. The editor-in-chief is Leslie E. Wolf. According to the Journal Citation Reports, the journal has a 2019 impact factor of 0.417.
