= The International Lawyer =

- Discipline: International law
- Language: English
- Edited by: John Attanasio, Marc Steinberg

Publication details
- History: 1966-present
- Frequency: Quarterly

Standard abbreviations
- Bluebook: Int'l Law.
- ISO 4: Int. Lawyer

Indexing
- ISSN: 0020-7810

Links
- Journal homepage

The International Lawyer is a quarterly peer-reviewed law journal and the official publication of the American Bar Association's (ABA) Section of International Law and Practice. It was established in 1966 and has been based at Southern Methodist University since 1986. The journal focuses primarily on practical issues of international law, including international trade, licensing, direct investment, finance, taxation, litigation, and dispute resolution.
