= National Dong Hwa University Hua-Shih College of Education =

Teacher-education school, Taiwan

Hua-Shih College of Education
- 國立東華大學花師教育學院
- Seal of Hua-Shih College of Education
- Motto: 公正恆毅
- Type: National (Public); Educational Studies; Teacher education
- Established: August 1, 2005
- Parent institution: National Dong Hwa University
- Affiliations: National Dong Hwa University
- Dean: Pan Wen-Fu
- Faculty: 55 (2024)
- Students: 1,459 (2024)
- Undergraduates: 839 (2024)
- Postgraduates: 620 (2024)
- Doctoral students: 134 (2024)
- Location: Shoufeng, Hualien, Taiwan
- Campus: Shoufeng Campus
- Website: Education.NDHU.edu.tw

Chinese name
- Traditional Chinese: 國立東華大學花師教育學院
- Simplified Chinese: 国立东华大学花师教育学院
Transcriptions
Standard Mandarin
- Hanyu Pinyin: Guólì Dōnghuá Dàxué Huāshī Jiàoyù Xuéyuàn
- Bopomofo: ㄍㄨㄛˊ ㄌㄧˋ ㄉㄨㄥ ㄏㄨㄚˊ ㄉㄚˋ ㄒㄩㄝˊ ㄏㄨㄚ ㄕ ㄐㄧㄠˋ ㄩˋ ㄒㄩㄝˊ ㄩㄢˋ
Southern Min
- Hokkien POJ: Kok-li̍p Tong-hôa Tāi-ha̍k Hoa-su Kàu-io̍k Ha̍k-īnn
- Tâi-lô: Kok-li̍p Tong-huâ Tāi-ha̍k Hua-su Kàu-io̍k Ha̍k-īnn

National Dong Hwa University Hua-Shih College of Education (Chinese: 國立東華大學花師教育學院; HSCE or Hua-Shih) is a teacher-education and education-research school of National Dong Hwa University in Hualian, Taiwan. HSCE is closely associated with the historical teacher's education tradition referred to as “Hua-Shih” (Chinese: 花師), which was Taiwan's first normal school after World War II and one of nine exclusive schools dedicated to early childhood and primary education since 1940s.

Hua-Shih's PhD program has 2nd largest Indonesian graduates among all PhD programs in Taiwan and was the first institution in Taiwan to offer MEd and PhD in Multicultural Education. The college become one of eight colleges at NDHU in 2008. Nowadays, Hua-Shih offers over 20 programs- BEd, MEd, MSc, PhD in Curriculum and Instruction, Early Childhood Education, Educational Policy & Administration, Special Education, Physical Education & Kinesiology, Multicultural Education, and Science Education.

== History ==
=== Hualien Normal School (–1992) ===
The origins of Hua-Shih can be traced to 27 October 1947, when Taiwan Provincial Hualien Normal School (Chinese: 臺灣省立花蓮師範學校) was established in Hualien City as one of the principal postwar institutions for training elementary-school teachers in eastern Taiwan. In 1949 it established an affiliated primary school as a practicum base for student teachers, reinforcing its role in the formation of elementary education in eastern Taiwan.

The institution's early development was repeatedly shaped by natural disasters. The 1951 Hualien earthquake severely damaged most of the campus, and Typhoon Winnie in 1958 destroyed the school buildings again, leading to plans for relocation. A new site at Meilun was approved in 1959, and the school completed its move there in September 1960, providing the physical base for later expansion.

In July 1964 the school was reorganized as Taiwan Provincial Hualien Teachers' College (Chinese: 臺灣省立花蓮師範專科學校), marking its transition from a normal-school model to a higher teacher-training institution. Night courses introduced in 1965 enabled in-service teachers to continue their professional training, and a further reorganization in 1987 as National Hualien Teachers' College (Chinese: 國立花蓮師範學院) created departments in primary education, language education, mathematics and science education, social education, and early childhood education. In 1988, Hua-Shih also established an extension division for elementary-school teachers and substitute teachers, which the university credits with helping relieve teacher shortages in eastern Taiwan.

=== College of Education, Hualien University of Education (2000–2008) ===
Although the name National Hualien University of Education (Chinese: 國立花蓮教育大學) was adopted only in 2005, the academic profile later associated with its College of Education was largely shaped during the 1990s and early 2000s. In August 1993, the institution established the Graduate Institute of Elementary Education (later renamed Graduate Institute of Compulsory Education), described by the university as the first graduate institute in the history of both Hua-Shih and later National Dong Hwa University.

This expansion of graduate education continued with the establishment of the Graduate Institute of Multicultural Education in 1996, as the first graduate institute in Taiwan devoted to multicultural education; Graduate Institute of Science Education in 1997; and eastern Taiwan's first master's program in special education teaching in 1999. Together, these units broadened the institution from a teacher-training school into a research-oriented centre for curriculum studies, science pedagogy, multicultural education, and inclusive education.

The College of Education was formally established on 1 August 2005, when National Hualien Teachers' College was upgraded to National Hualien University of Education. The new college symbolized the institution's transition from a single-purpose teacher-training environment to a broader educational setting oriented toward graduate study, research, and the cultivation of diverse education-related professions.

=== Hua-Shih College of Education, National Dong Hwa University (2008–present) ===
On 1 August 2008, National Hualien University of Education was merged into National Dong Hwa University, and the College of Education thereafter became part of the reorganized university under the name Hua-Shih College of Education in memory of its 60-year dedication to Taiwan's teacher's education. The merger placed the former Hua-Shih institution within a comprehensive university structure and shifted its setting from a purely teacher-training environment to a broader context for preparing a wider range of education-related professionals.

After 2008, Hua-Shih's departments and graduate institutes were progressively integrated. The former Department of Elementary Education, already reorganized as the Department of Curriculum Design and Human Potentials Development, was merged with the Graduate Institute of Elementary Education in 2008, the Graduate Institute of Education (Originally founded by NDHU College of Humanities and Social Sciences in 1994) in 2009, and the Graduate Institutes of Multicultural Education and Graduate Institutes of Science Education in 2010, creating a more consolidated academic structure within Hua-Shih. In September 2011, following a three-year post-merger integration process, Hua-Shih moved from the historic Meilun campus to the university's larger Shoufeng main campus.

As part of National Dong Hwa University, Hua-Shih College of Education retained its traditional strengths in teacher education while expanding its regional and academic reach. The legacy of its earlier innovations remained visible in areas such as special education, science education, and multicultural education, the latter of which was the first academic program in Taiwan founded specifically on the principle of multicultural education.

== Academic ==
- National Dong Hwa University; Hua-Shih College of Education; Rankings

Global Ranking
QS Education and Training	351-400 (2026)
SCImage Gender Studies	197 (2026)

National Ranking
QS Education and Training	4 (2026)
SCImage Gender Studies	1 (2026)

Hua-Shih College of Education has gone through over 80 years for Teacher education and Educational research since its foundation as Hualian Normal School. In 2026, Hua-Shih was ranked 4th in Taiwan (72nd in Asia) for Education and Training by QS World University Rankings by Sublects, whose Academic Reputation was ranked 3rd in Taiwan (43th in Asia). In 2026, SCImago Journal and Institutions Rank ranked Hua-Shih 1st in Taiwan (14th in Asia) for Gender Studies, making the school the only Taiwanese university featured in this ranking.

=== Academic organizations ===
==== Departments ====
- Department of Education and Human Potentials Development (DEHPD)
- Department of Educational Administration and Management (DEAM)
- Department of Early Childhood Education (ECE)
- Department of Special Education (DSE)
- Department of Physical Education and Kinesiology (DPEK)

==== Graduate programs (college-level) ====
- Graduate Program of Multicultural Education (Master and Ph.D.)

==== Research and service centers ====
- Center for Multicultural Education
- Indigenous Education Center
- Rural Reading and Action Center
- Center for Special Education
- Science Education Center
- Digital Learning Companion Center
- Sport Science and Technology Center
- Educational Neuroscience Center

=== Publications ===
- Journal of Educational and Multicultural Research (TSSCI) (Chinese: 教育與多元文化研究期刊)

== Academic programs ==
=== Graduate ===
==== Doctor of Philosophy (PhD) ====
The Doctoral programs (PhD) at NDHU Hua-Shih College of Education are intended for students who plan scholarly careers involving research, teaching, and educational leadership. Major PhD programs include:

- PhD in Education
  - Concentration in Curriculum and Instruction
  - Concentration in Education Policy and Administration
  - Concentration in Special Education
  - Concentration in Sport Education
- PhD in Science Education
- PhD in Multicultural Education

==== Master of Education (MEd) ====
Hua-Shih offers Master of Education (M.Ed.) programs across multiple fields:

- MEd in Education
- MEd in Educational Administration and Management
- MEd in Early Childhood Education
- MEd in Individuals with Special Needs and Assistive Technology
- MEd in Physical Education and Kinesiology
- MEd in Multicultural Education

==== Master of Science (MSc) ====
- MS in Science Education

=== Undergraduate ===
Hua-Shih offers Bachelor of Education (B.Ed.) programs in five departments:

- Bachelor of Education (BEd) in Education and Human Potentials Development
- Bachelor of Education (BEd) in Educational Administration and Management
- Bachelor of Education (BEd) in Early Childhood Education
- Bachelor of Education (BEd) in Special Education
- Bachelor of Education (BEd) in Physical Education and Kinesiology

A professional post-baccalaureate program is also provided for early childhood education:

- Bachelor of Education (BEd) in Educare Giver (Post-Baccalaureate Program of Educare Giver)

== Alumni ==
Notable present and past NDHU faculty include:

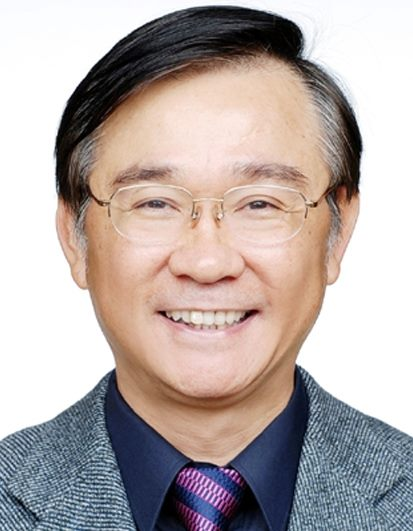
Incumbent Director of Department of Education, Taipei City Government Tang Chih-Min (AA)

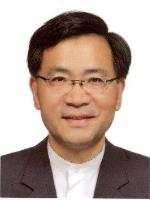
Deputy Mayor & Director of Department of Education, Taipei City Government Tsai Ping-kun (AA)

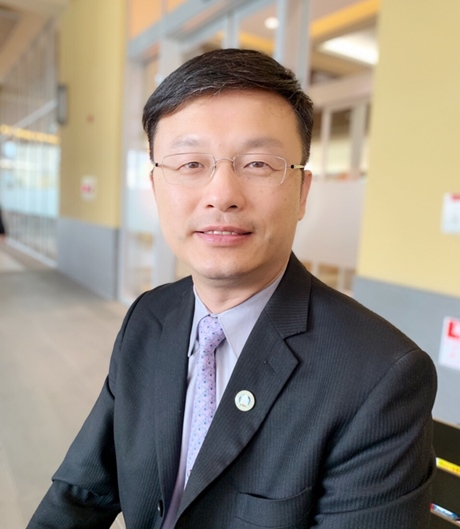
Incumbent Director of Department of Education, New Taipei City Government Chang Ming-Wen (MEd)

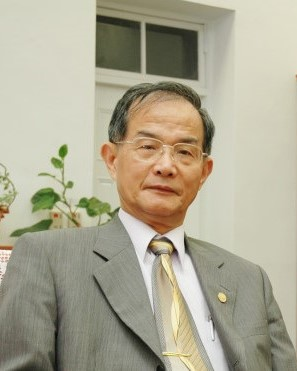
The 13th & 14th Principal of Chien Kuo High School Wu Wu-Hsiung (AA)

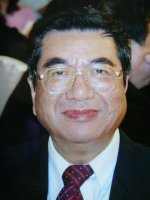
The giant of special education in the Chinese-speaking world Wu Wu-Tien (AA)

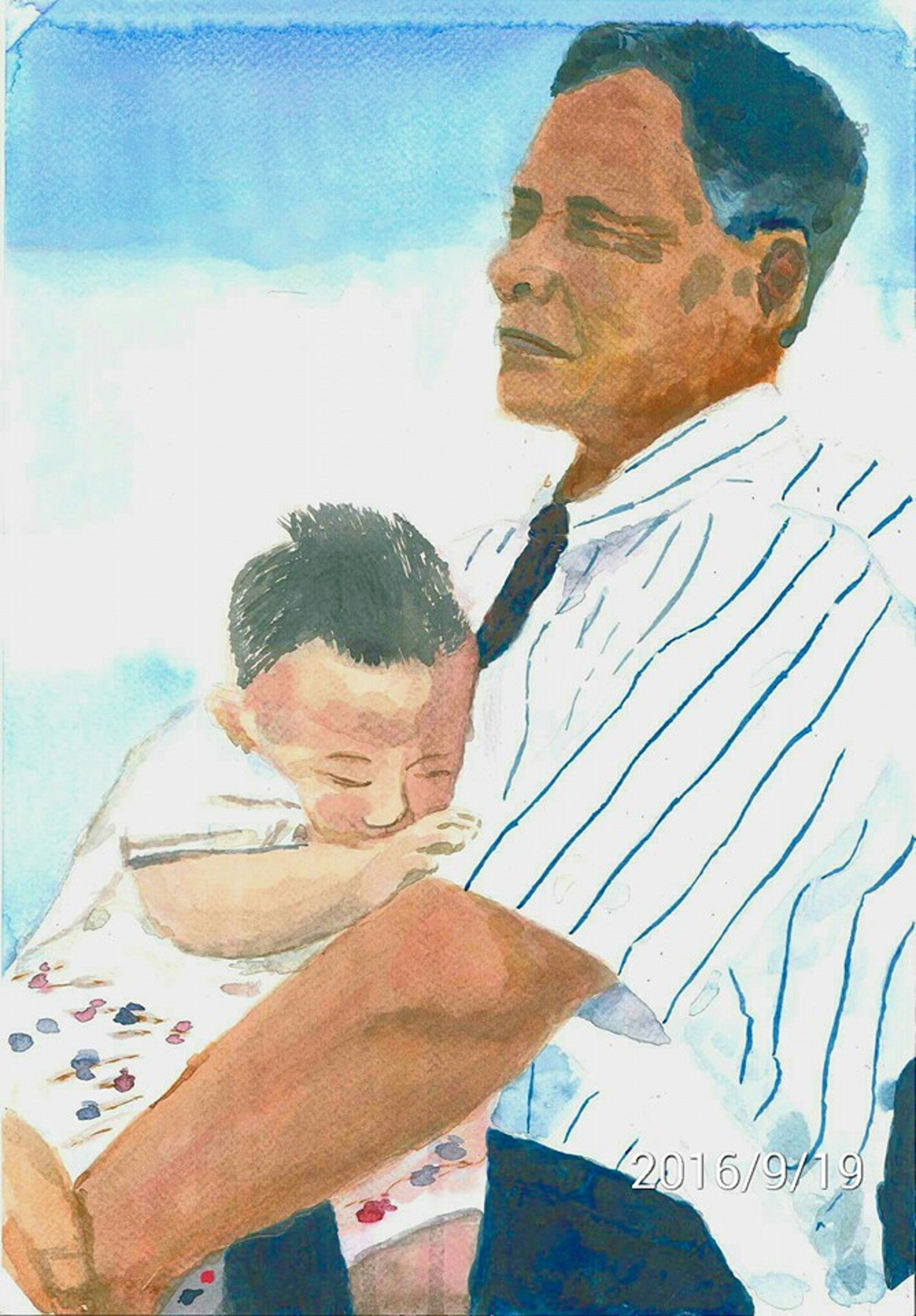
The Taiwan's first indigenous principal Tiway Sayion (AA)

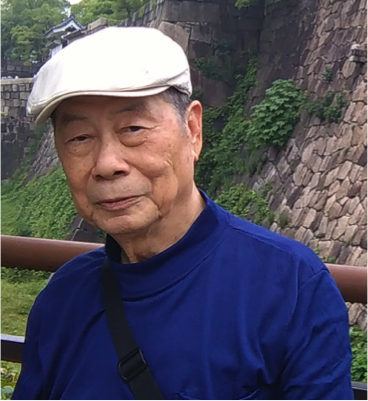
The Taiwan's giant of indigenous music Lin Dao Sheng (AA)

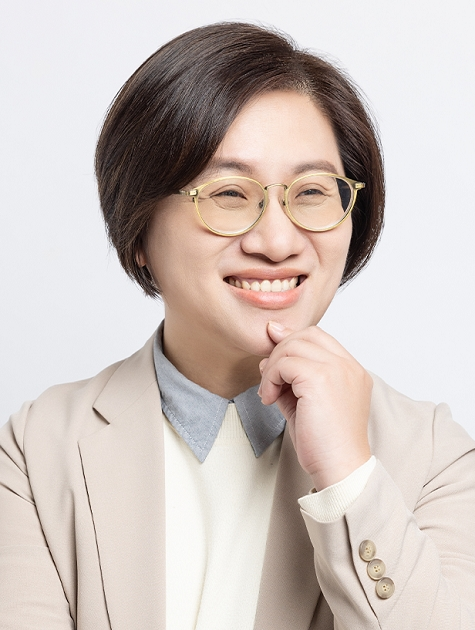
The DPP Caucus Secretary General at Legislative Yuan Chen Pei-Yu (MEd)
