= National Dong Hwa University College of the Arts =

- 國立東華大學藝術學院
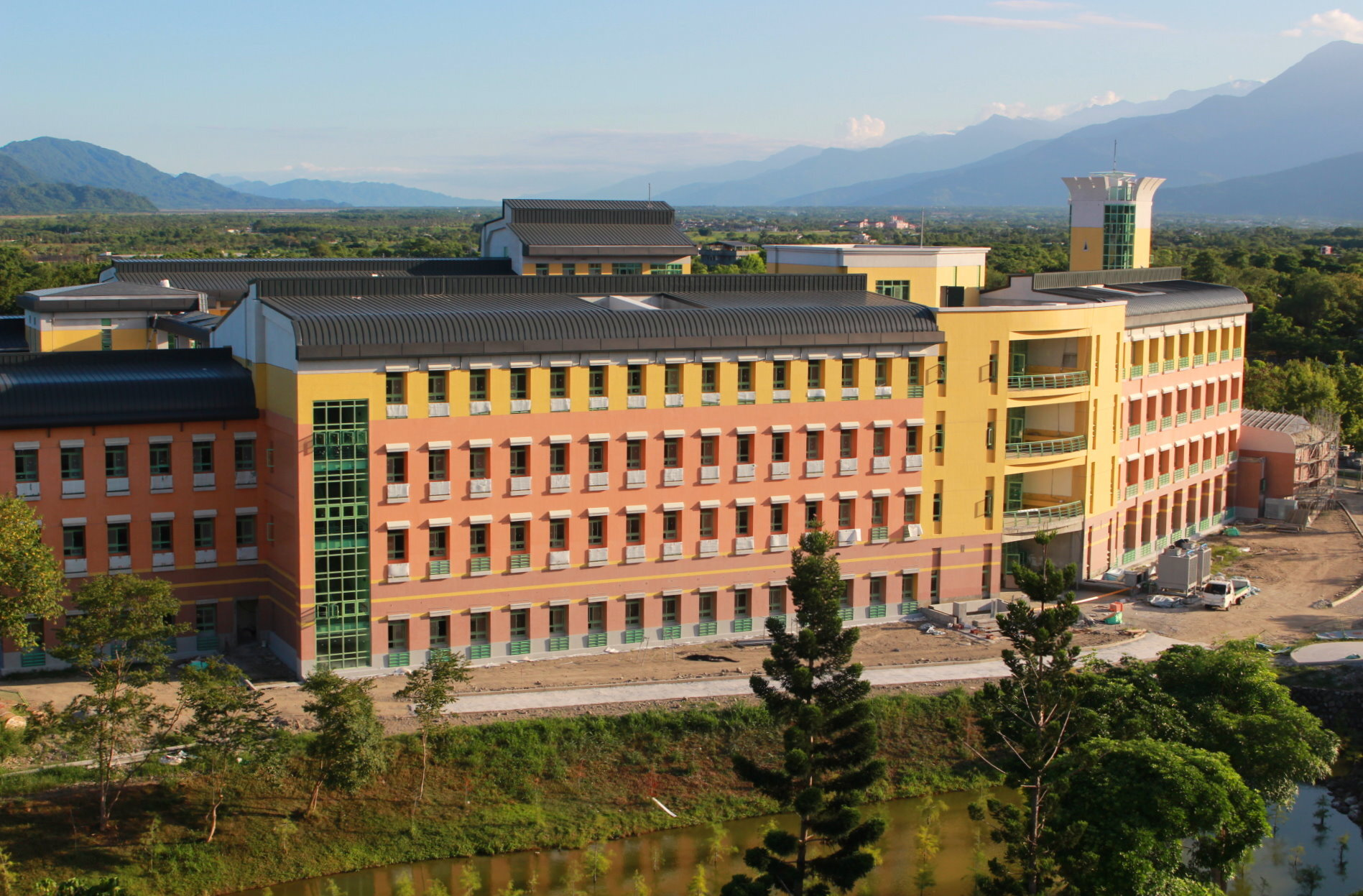
- NDHU College of the Arts Building
- Type: Public (National); Art School; Music School
- Established: August 1, 2005 (21 years ago)
- Affiliations: National Dong Hwa University
- Dean: Liao Qinghua
- Students: 688 (2024)
- Undergraduates: 524 (2024)
- Postgraduates: 164 (2024)
- Location: Shoufeng, Hualien, Taiwan
- Website: Arts.NDHU.edu.tw
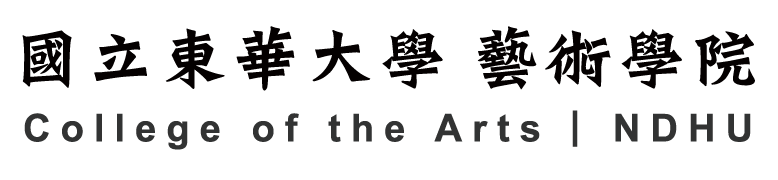

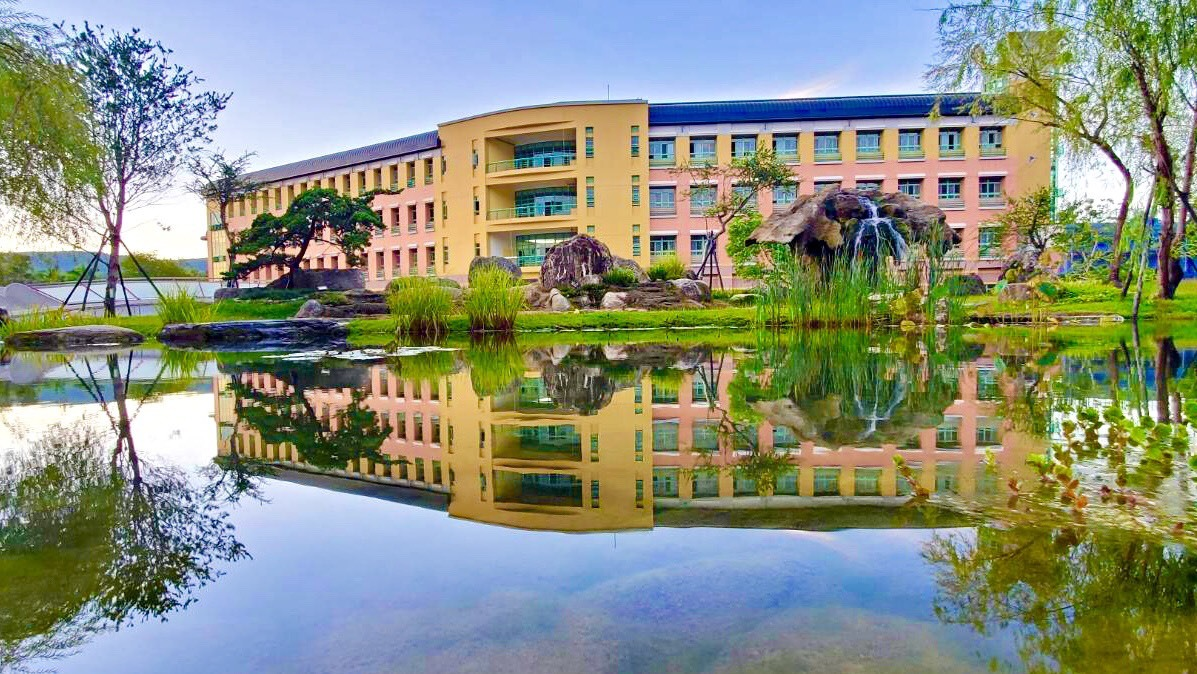
NDHU College of the Arts building and environment

National Dong Hwa University College of the Arts (NDHU ARTS; Chinese: 國立東華大學藝術學院; pinyin: Dōnghuá Rénwén Shèhuì Yìshù Xuéyuàn) is the world's leading art school at National Dong Hwa University (NDHU). Founded in 2005, with Professor Hsu Hsiu-Chu, the Dean of School of Arts at Macao Polytechnic University, as Founding Dean.

NDHU ARTS houses the largest concert hall in eastern Taiwan, holding same level with National Theater and Concert Hall. The school also has an arts workshop, Artopia Art Space, and Cre8 Hub Creative Center. In 2026, NDHU ARTS was ranked 1st in Taiwan (95th in the world) for Art & Design and 1st in Taiwan (101-150th in the world) for Performing Arts by QS World University Rankings by Subject.

== History ==
=== Hualien Normal School (–1992) ===
The NDHU College of the Arts traces its origins to the art and music tracks that were added to the General Teacher-Training Division of Taiwan Provincial Hualien Normal School (Chinese: 臺灣省立花蓮師範學校 ) after it was upgraded to a junior teachers’ college in the early 1960s. Students intent on becoming primary-school art or music teachers could elect one of the two streams from their fourth year, although the exact year in which the streaming system began is uncertain.

A dedicated Music Education Building was completed on campus in 1973; it was demolished in March 1988 and replaced the same month by a larger facility. Work on an Art Education Building followed in 1989, and the new structure was formally inaugurated on November 29, 1991.

When the school became the Taiwan Provincial Hualien Teachers College in July 1987, its newly created Department of Elementary Education contained separate art and music divisions—an administrative arrangement regarded as the formal starting point of the College of the Arts. The music division split away as the Department of Music Education in August 1992, followed by the art division, which became the Department of Art Education in 1993.

In the same year, planners for the as-yet unfounded National Hua-Dong University (the institution that would become National Dong Hwa University) proposed establishing a future College of the Arts comprising departments of fine arts, music, dance, and physical education.

=== College of the Arts, Hualien University of Education (2000–2008) ===
The two departments were joined by the Graduate Institute of Visual Arts Education in 2000, forming a “two-department, one-institute” structure that met Ministry of Education criteria for a full college.

In August 2005 the parent institution was elevated to National Hualien University of Education (NHUE), and the three units were formally grouped as the College of the Arts. Professor Hsiu-Chu Hsu (徐秀菊) of the Graduate Institute became the founding dean. That year Professor Pan Sheau-shei (Yuki Pan; 潘小雪) drafted a plan—never realised—to relocate the College to the disused Jian Tobacco Factory (Hualien Cultural and Creative Industries Park) and to launch a Graduate Institute of Cultural and Creative Industries.

NHUE began phasing out teacher-training status for its non-education units in 2005: the Department of Music Education became simply the Department of Music, and in 2006 the Department of Art Education was renamed the Department of Art and Design, the second Taiwanese program to adopt that title. A master’s program in music and the Graduate Institute of Tech Art were authorised in 2007.

=== College of the Arts, National Dong Hwa University (2008–present) ===
On February 1, 2008, NHUE merged with National Dong Hwa University (NDHU), and the College became one of NDHU’s constituent colleges; the former NHUE main campus was redesignated the Meilun Campus. In 2009, Professor Pan Sheau-shei (Yuki Pan) succeeded Hsu as dean after the latter accepted an appointment of Dean of School of Arts at Macao Polytechnic University.

A major internal restructuring in 2010 created the Department of Creative Arts Industries, absorbing the Graduate Institute of Visual Arts Education and the Graduate Institute of Indigenous Arts (founded in 2004 under the NDHU College of Indigenous Studies) as two master’s tracks; the Tech-Art Institute was folded into the Department of Art and Design as a graduate track the same year.

Between 2011 and 2015 all teaching and administrative units were transferred from the Meilun to the Shoufeng main campus. The ARTS building was completed in September 2021, enabling the College’s units to consolidate under one roof.

In 2015, Frances Liu succeeded Pan Sheau-shei as dean of NDHU ARTS after the latter accepted an appointment of Director of Museum of Contemporary Art Taipei. NDHU ARTS has since broadened its academic profile. International tracks were opened in each master’s program in 2022, and the first college-level doctoral program—the International PhD in Trans-disciplinary Arts—enrolled its inaugural class in 2024.

== Academic ==
=== Reputation ===
- National Dong Hwa University; College of the Arts; Rankings

Global Ranking
QS Art and Design	95 (2026)
QS Performing Arts	101-150 (2026)

National Ranking
QS Art and Design	1 (2026)
QS Performing Arts	1 (2026)

NDHU College of the Arts gained fast-growing reputation in recent decade. In 2026, QS World University Rankings by Subject ranked NDHU College of the Arts 1st in Taiwan (21st in Asia) for Arts & Design and 1st in Taiwan (15th in Asia) for Performing Arts, making NDHU ARTS the only Taiwanese arts school under 45 years old featured in the rankings.

=== Academic organizations ===
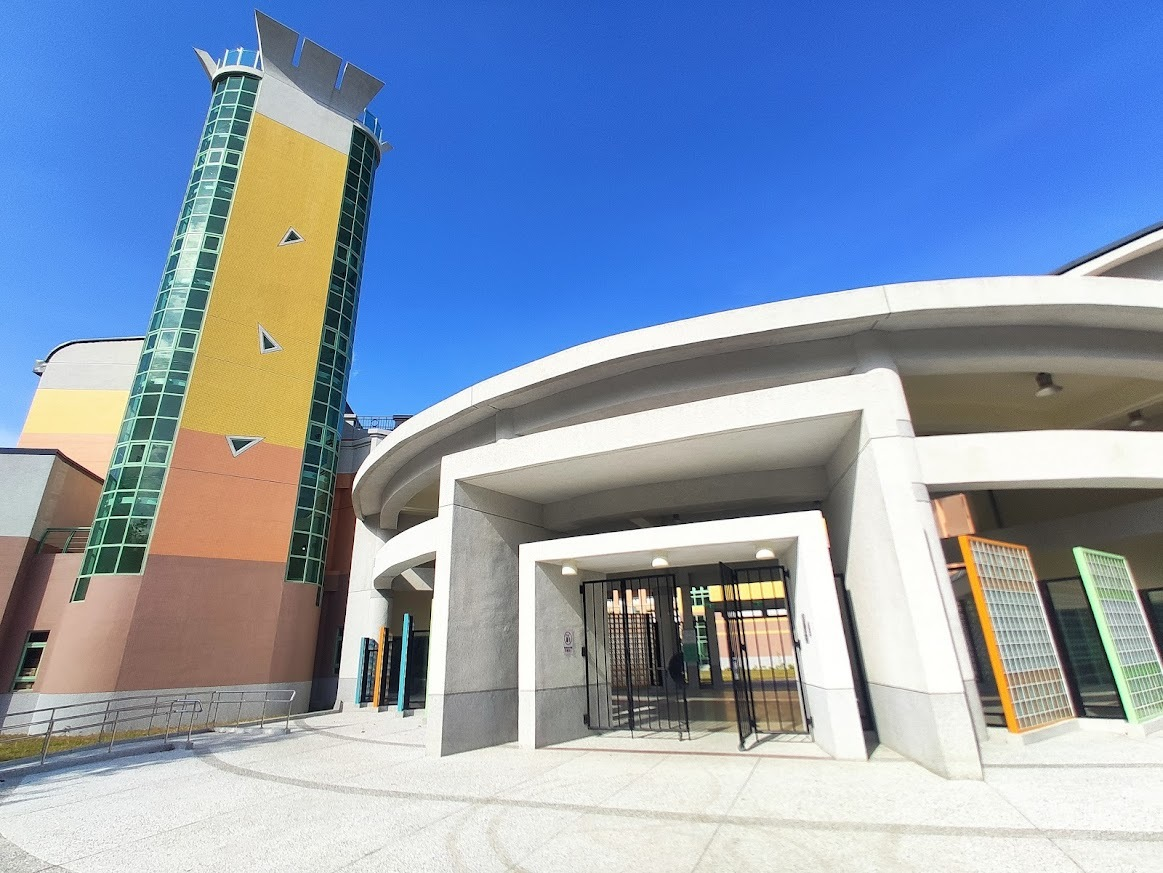
The mian gate of NDHU College of the Arts Building

==== Departments ====
- Department of Music (MUS)
- Department of Arts and Design (AAD)
- Department of Arts and Creative Industries (ACI)

== Academic programs ==
=== Graduate ===
==== Doctor of Philosophy (PhD) ====
The Doctoral program (PhD) at NDHU College of the Arts is a full-time, in-residence program intended for students who plan scholarly careers involving research and teaching in Interdisciplinary Arts.

- PhD in Interdisciplinary Arts (International)

==== Master of Arts (MA) ====
Master of Arts (MA) has two major tracks for MA students follow at NDHU College of the Arts:

- MA in Indigenous Arts
- MA in Visual Arts Education

==== Master of Music (MM) ====
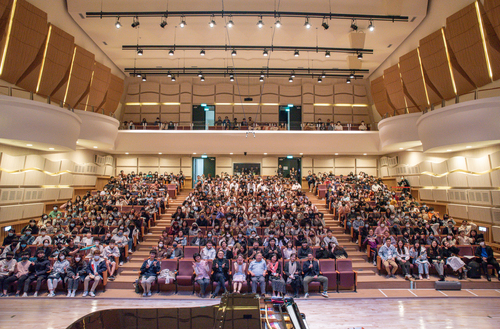
NDHU College of Arts Concert Hall interior (auditorium seating and stage)

Master of Arts (MA) has eight major tracks for MA students follow at NDHU College of the Arts:

- MM in Vocal Music
- MM in Choral Conducting
- MM in Violin
- MM in Viola/Cello
- MM in Flute/Clarinet
- MM in Percussion
- MM in Jazz
- MM in Jazz Vocal

==== Master of Fine Arts (MFA) ====
NDHU ARTS's Master of Fine Arts (MFA) in Arts and Design, which MFA students can submit creative works as thesis. Qualified student will receive this degree after passing final defense of its artworks.

=== Undergraduate ===
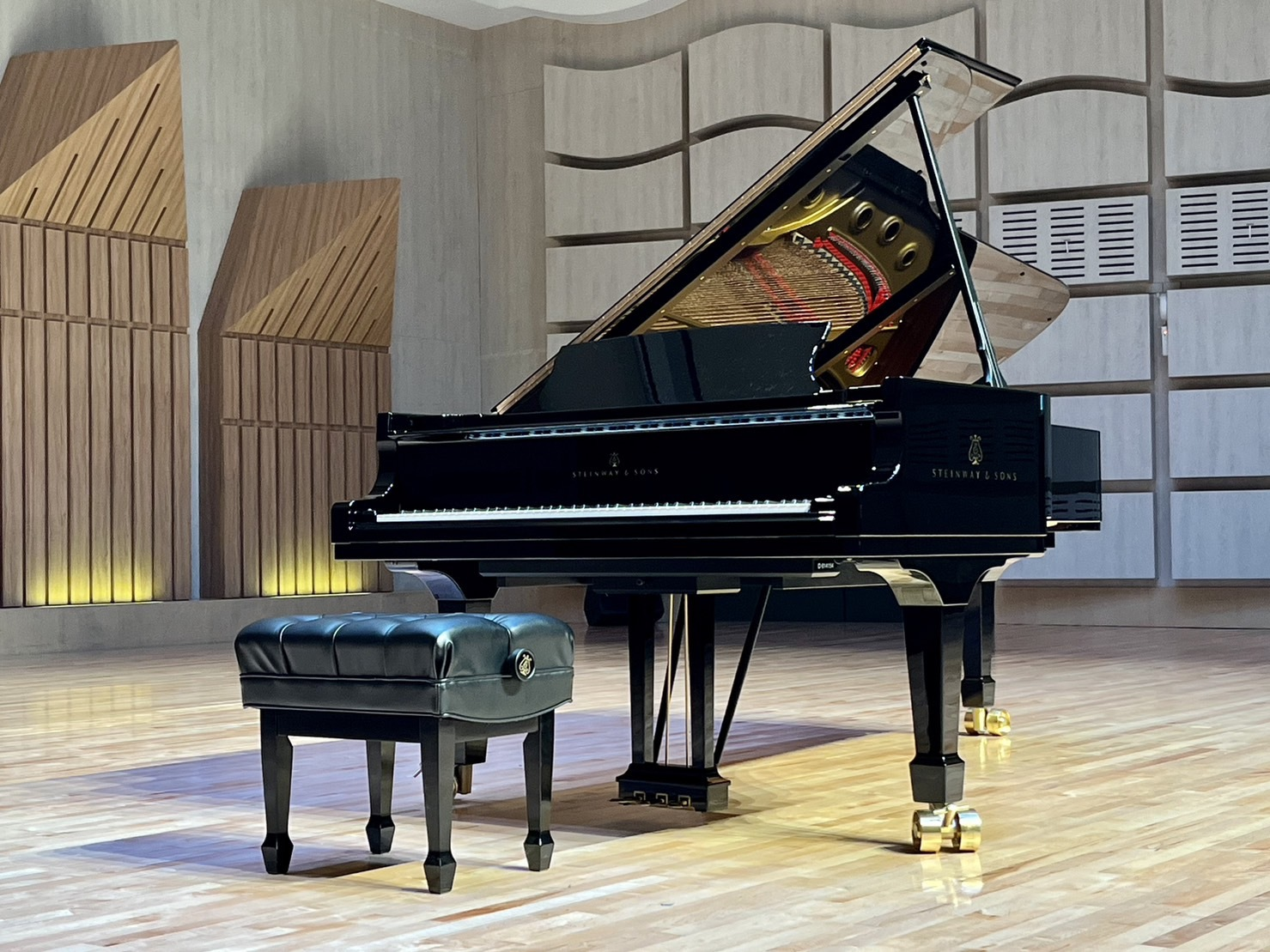
The Steinway D-274 at NDHU College of the Arts Concert Hall

NDHU College of the Arts offers 11 programs in different majors.

- Bachelor of Arts (BA) in Arts & Creative Industries
- Bachelor of Arts (BA) in Arts and Design
- Bachelor of Music (BM) in Piano
- Bachelor of Music (BM) in Violin
- Bachelor of Music (BM) in Viola/Cello
- Bachelor of Music (BM) in Flute/Clarinet
- Bachelor of Music (BM) in Percussion
- Bachelor of Music (BM) in Vocal Music
- Bachelor of Music (BM) in Choral Conducting
- Bachelor of Music (BM) in Jazz
- Bachelor of Music (BM) in Jazz Vocal

These programs operate on a modular system where students design their curricula to pace their studies. They may also take modules of their interest, subject to any prerequisite requirements and to the availability of modules.

== Facilities ==
=== Performing Arts ===
==== College of Arts Concert Hall ====
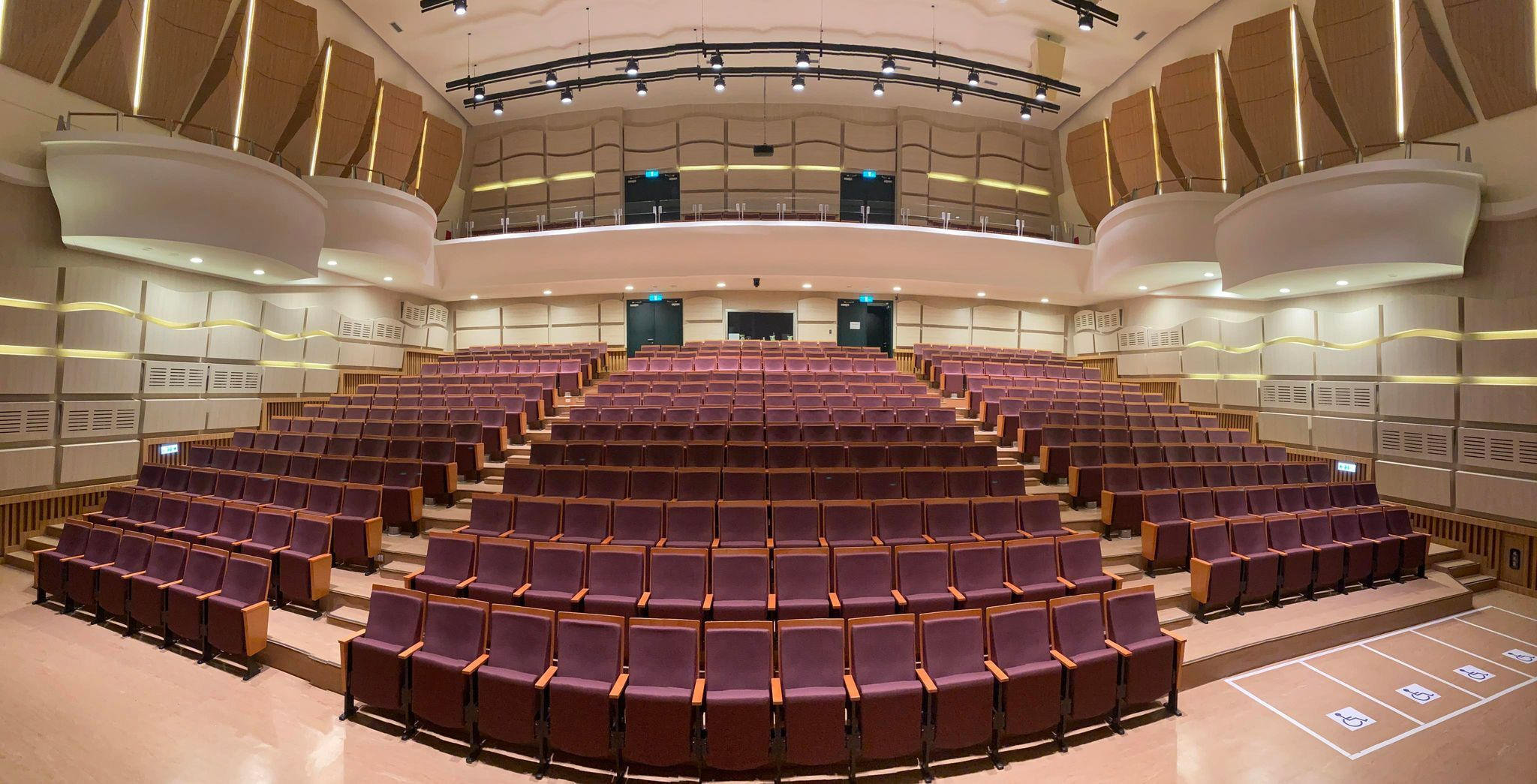
Audience seating in the NDHU ARTS Concert Hall

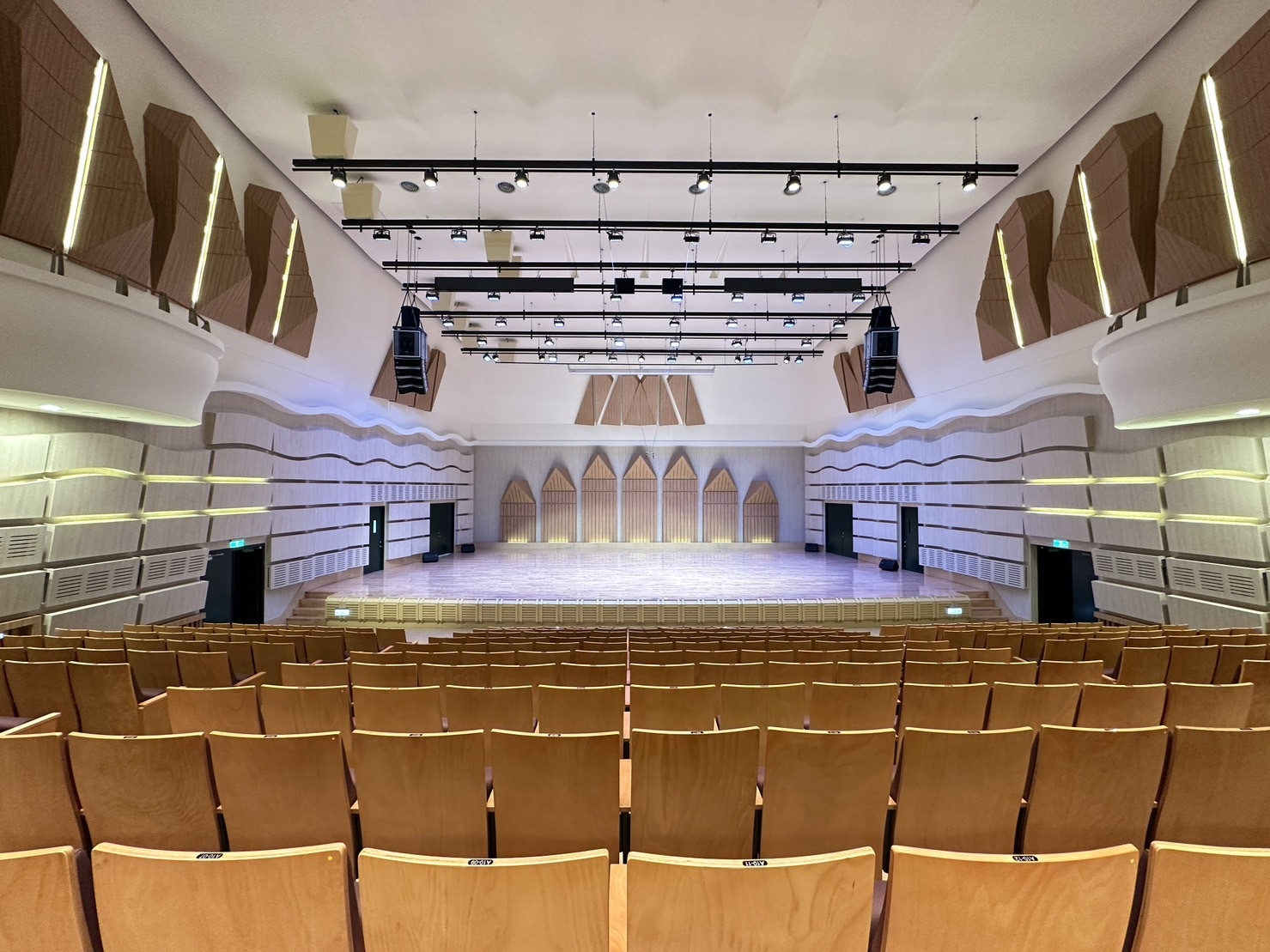
Stage of the NDHU ARTS Concert Hall

NDHU College of the Arts Concert Hall, also known as the NDHU Performance Hall, is an auditorium with acoustics on par with the National Theater and Concert Hall. It has two levels with a total of 430 seats (381 on the first floor and 49 on the balcony, including 5 accessible seats). A flagship Steinway & Sons Model D-274 concert grand piano is installed on stage, making it the highest-grade performing arts venue in eastern Taiwan. There are many world's musician host concert in this venue, including Antonio Hart, Leonard Slatkin, Lü Shao-chia, and Alex Sipiagin.

=== Craft Education ===
==== Arts Workshop ====
NDHU Arts Workshop (Chinese: 東華藝術工坊) focuses on indigenous arts, combining the concepts of "ethnicity," "creation," "creativity," and "art." Emphasizing both tradition and innovation, as well as originality and craftsmanship, it aims to promote a tribal aesthetic economy and stylistic development.

===== Metalworking Workshop =====
Focused on jewelry metalworking design and techniques. Courses cover fundamental skills in metal crafting and design aesthetics, preparing students for certifications such as the "Metalworking Technician" license.

===== Weaving Workshop =====
Equipped with imported looms and braiding machines. The curriculum covers weaving processes, material use, and basic techniques. Students learn fiber art and textile design, understanding the properties of fibers and textiles and acquiring fundamental sewing skills.

===== Natural Dye Workshop =====
Teaches Taiwan’s traditional plant dyeing techniques, including foraging, extraction, and dyeing. Students practice tie-dye, stitch dye, clamp-resist dyeing, and stencil dyeing, along with color matching and design thinking. They create hand-dyed works and learn about indigenous dyeing and weaving culture.

===== Ceramics Workshop =====
Offers courses from basic pottery to advanced independent creation, covering primitive firing, glazing, decorative techniques, and ceramic bead making. Students learn the process from traditional pottery to creative ceramics, including materials analysis, ceramic art history, and cultural context.

===== 2D Media Workshop =====
Focuses on inspiring tribal artistic aesthetics and creative product design. Coursework includes decorative pattern design and developing creative products such as painted ceramic plates, tile paintings, body painting, and wood painting.

===== Picture Book Workshop =====
Dedicated to creative illustration, handmade book production, and innovative teaching methods. Through theory, workshops, creative practice, and pedagogy, students explore the narrative qualities of picture books and engage in picture book creation and research.

=== Art Exhibitions ===
==== Artopia Art Space ====
The NDHU Artopia Art Space (Chinese: 東華藝托邦藝文空間) is an art and cultural venue operated by NDHU College of the Arts. It is situated in downtown Hualien City, between Bo’ai Street and Jieyue Street in the old railway cultural park pedestrian area. NDHU Artopia Art Space was originally the faculty guest house of National Hualien University of Education; after the merger with NDHU, it was renovated and transformed into the Artopia Art Space.

Opened on December 12, 2013, Artopia has hosted numerous exhibitions and events, becoming an important arts and culture hub in Hualien City. Its mission is to provide diverse artistic and cultural services, including reading, exhibitions, performances, lectures, outreach programs, and workshops. Past activities have included the "Arts in the Community" series, faculty joint exhibitions, and international artist residency programs.
