= National Dong Hwa University =

Public research university in Hualien, Taiwan

- 國立東華大學 (Chinese)
- Motto: 自由, 民主, 創造, 卓越
- Motto in English: "Freedom, Democracy, Creativity, Excellence"
- Type: public research university
- Established: 1 July 1994
- Academic affiliations: EUTW; UMAP; AACSB; NUST; IEET
- Endowment: NT$2.28 billion (2024)
- President: Han-Chieh Chao
- Provost: Shin-Feng Lin
- Academic staff: 620+
- Students: 10,350 (2023)
- Undergraduates: 7,975 (2023)
- Postgraduates: 2,375 (2023)
- Doctoral students: 412 (2023)
- Location: Shoufeng, Hualien, Taiwan
- Campus: Shoufeng (Rural) 251 ha (620 acres) Meilun (Suburban) 12.3 ha (30 acres) Pingtung (Rural) 0.74 ha (1.8 acres)
- Newspaper: The NDHU Voice
- Colors: NDHU Green
- Sporting affiliations: Chinese Taipei University Sport Federation
- Mascot: Formosan ring-necked pheasant
- Website: www.ndhu.edu.tw

Chinese name
- Traditional Chinese: 國立東華大學
- Simplified Chinese: 国立东华大学
Transcriptions
Standard Mandarin
- Hanyu Pinyin: Guólì Dōnghuá Dàxué
- Bopomofo: ㄍㄨㄛˊ ㄌㄧˋ ㄉㄨㄥ ㄏㄨㄚˊ ㄉㄚˋ ㄒㄩㄝˊ
- Wade–Giles: Kuo²-li⁴ Tung-hua² Ta⁴-hsüeh²
- Tongyong Pinyin: Guólì Donghuá Dàsyué
- MPS2: Guólì Dūnghuá Dàshiué
Hakka
- Romanization: Guedˋlib Dungˊvaˇ Tai-hog
- Pha̍k-fa-sṳ: Kwet-li̍p Tung-fâ Thài-ho̍k
Southern Min
- Hokkien POJ: Kok-li̍p Tong-hôa Tāi-ha̍k
- Tâi-lô: Kok-li̍p Tong-huâ Tāi-ha̍k

National Dong Hwa University (Chinese: 國立東華大學; pinyin: Guólì Dōnghuá Dàxué; NDHU) is a public research university in Hualien, Taiwan.

The university is organized into eight colleges, 44 academic departments, and 56 graduate institutes, enrolling around 10,000 undergraduate and graduate students, including over 1,000 international students.

NDHU is a member of six Taiwan's European Union Centre, a Think Tank for European Studies. With Taiwan's oldest school for Indigenous Studies, NDHU College of Indigenous Studies is among the leading institutes of its kind in Asia.

NDHU has Taiwan's fifth highest endowment among national universities and NDHU Library holds more than two million volumes and is eighth largest academic library in Taiwan. The university's main campus is located in Shoufeng, in the northern half of Hualien County. Encompassing an area of 251 hectares (620 acres), the main campus houses almost all colleges and research institutes except the Graduate Institute of Marine Biology, which is jointly founded in National Museum of Marine Biology and Aquarium.

== History ==
=== Foundation ===
National Dong Hwa University was established in 1994 in Shoufeng. It was the first university in Taiwan founded after the Martial law period (1949–1987). Mu Tzung-Tsann, the vice-chancellor of California State University, Los Angeles, served as the university's first president. He resigned from his vice-chancellorship and relinquished his green card in order to oversee the university's planning, during which he consulted the senior executives of multiple U.S. universities. Alan Kreditor, vice president of the University of Southern California, was among those who advised the university's planning.

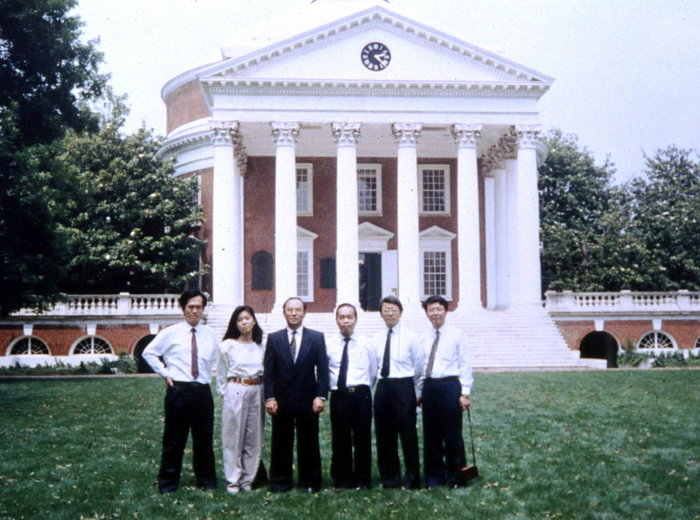
Founding president Mu Tzung-Tsann at the University of Virginia, one of NDHU's models

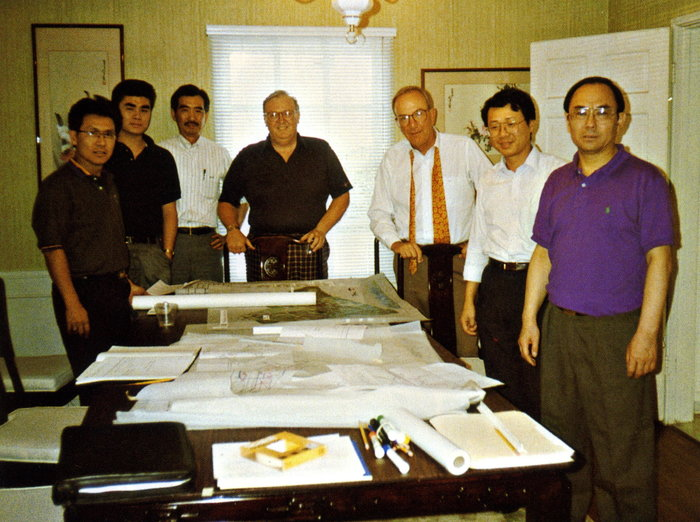
Mu Tzung-Tsann with a university planning committee

=== National Hualien University of Education (1947–2008) ===
The National Hualien University of Education (Commonly known as Hua-Shih; 花師) was one of Taiwan's oldest normal schools. It was established in 1947 in Hualien City as the Taiwan Provincial Hualien Normal School (TPHNS) as part of the country's reconstruction and development after World War II.

In 2008, with financial support from the Ministry of Education, National Dong Hwa University merged with the National Hualien University of Education.

=== Present ===
In 2018, Chao Han-Chieh, a fellow of the Institution of Engineering and Technology and the British Computer Society, became the university's fourth president.

== Campuses ==
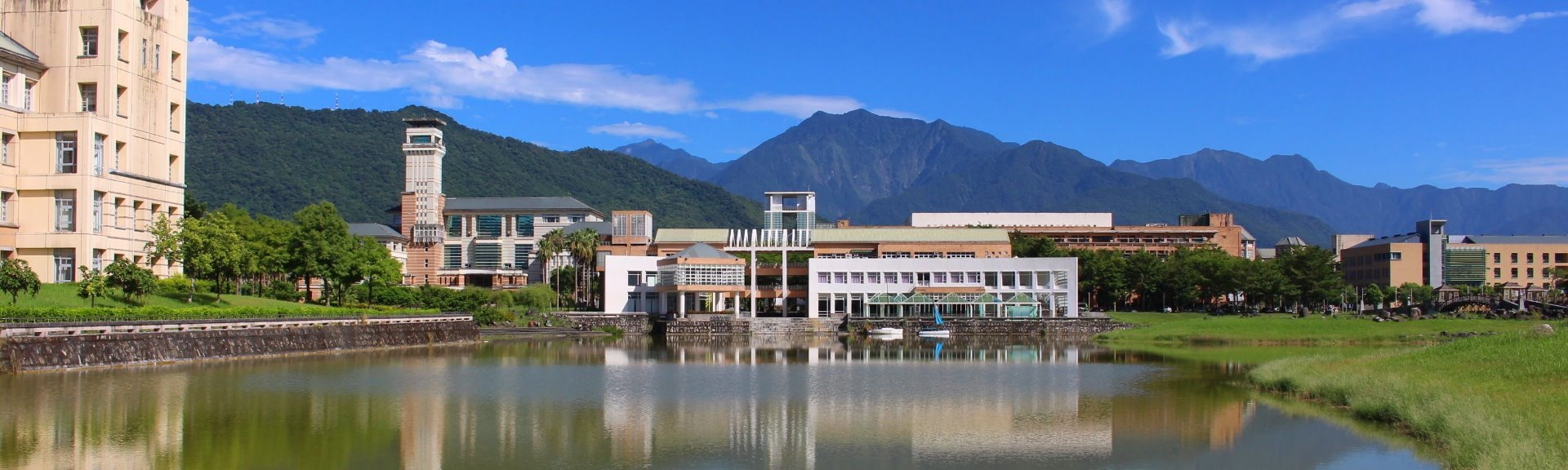
National Dong Hwa University Campus View

=== Shoufeng ===
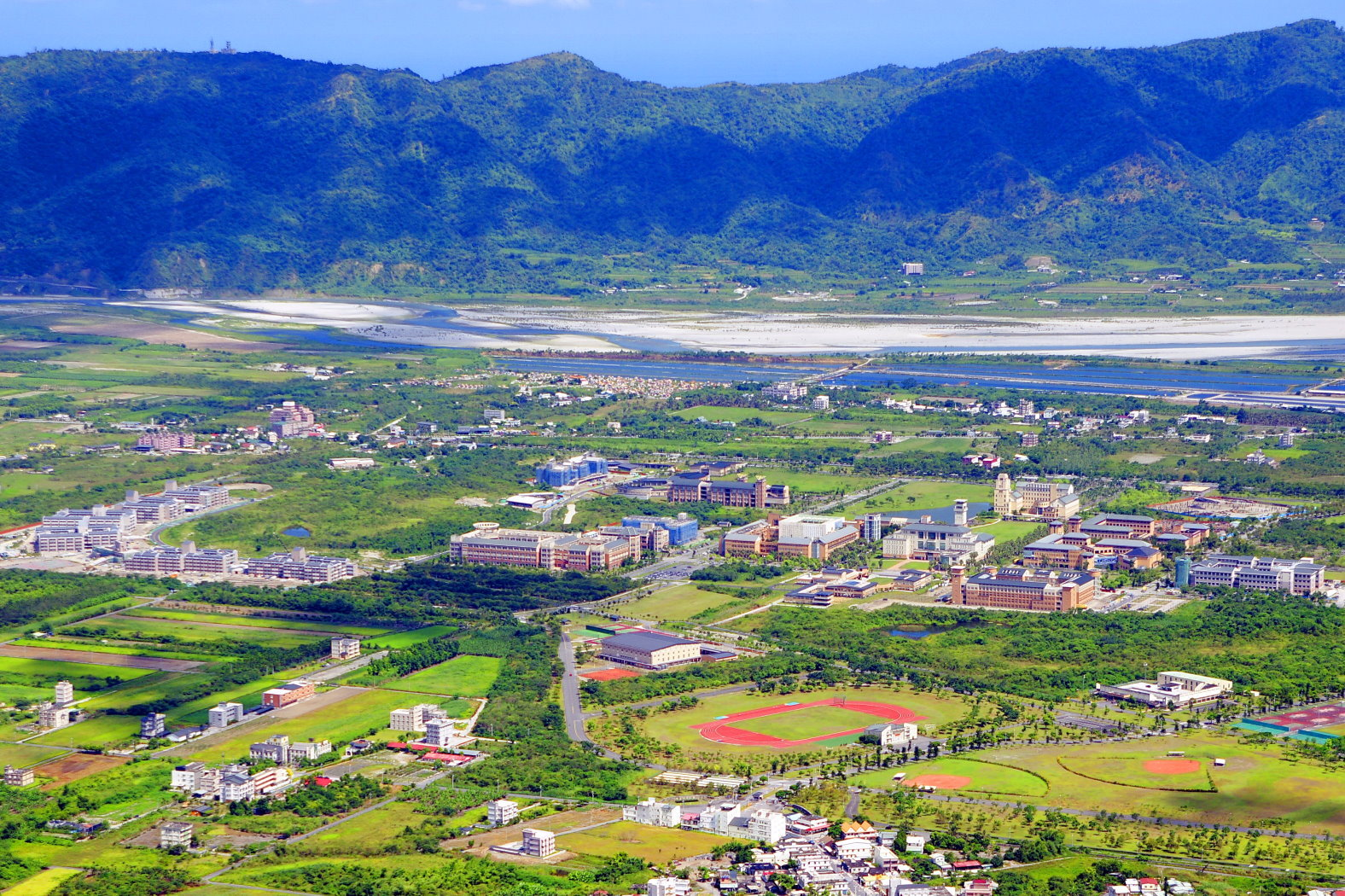
Overview of NDHU Main Campus

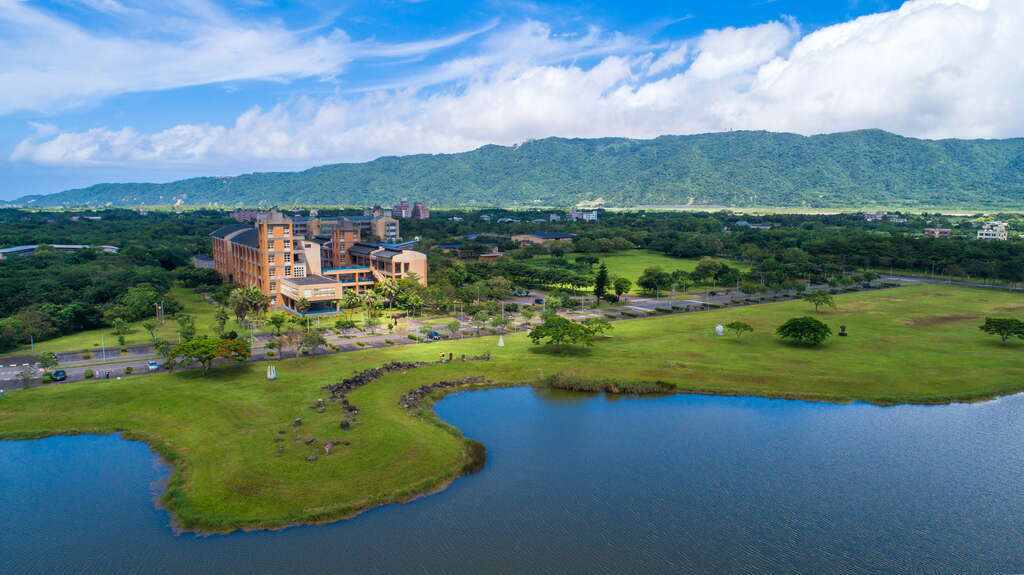
NDHU Dong Lake and College of Indigenous Studies

NDHU's main campus, Shoufeng Campus, is situated in the rural town of Shoufeng, Hualien. It is located in Papaya Creek in East Rift Valley, surrounded by a mountain range, about 35 kilometres (22 mi) south of Taroko National Park, 15 kilometres (9.3 mi) south of Hualien City.

NDHU's 251-hectare (620-acre) campus is the largest flat-land university campus in Taiwan. The campus was designed in a postmodern style by architect Charles Moore, the dean of the Yale School of Architecture.

The Shoufeng campus's academic buildings—including the campus library, art museum, concert hall, and arts workshop—are located at the center of campus. The NDHU Concert Hall, a part of the College of The Arts, is the largest performing arts hall in eastern Taiwan. Adjacent to the academic buildings section are two student dormitories and campus athletics facilities, including a stadium, swimming pools, athletic field, baseball field, basketball court, tennis court, volleyball court, kayak, and facilities for Project Adventure.

In 2016, NDHU ran a solar university project, constructing the first batch of rooftop photovoltaic solar panels. As of 2021, the solar energy covers 40% of NDHU's annual electric usage.

=== Meilun ===
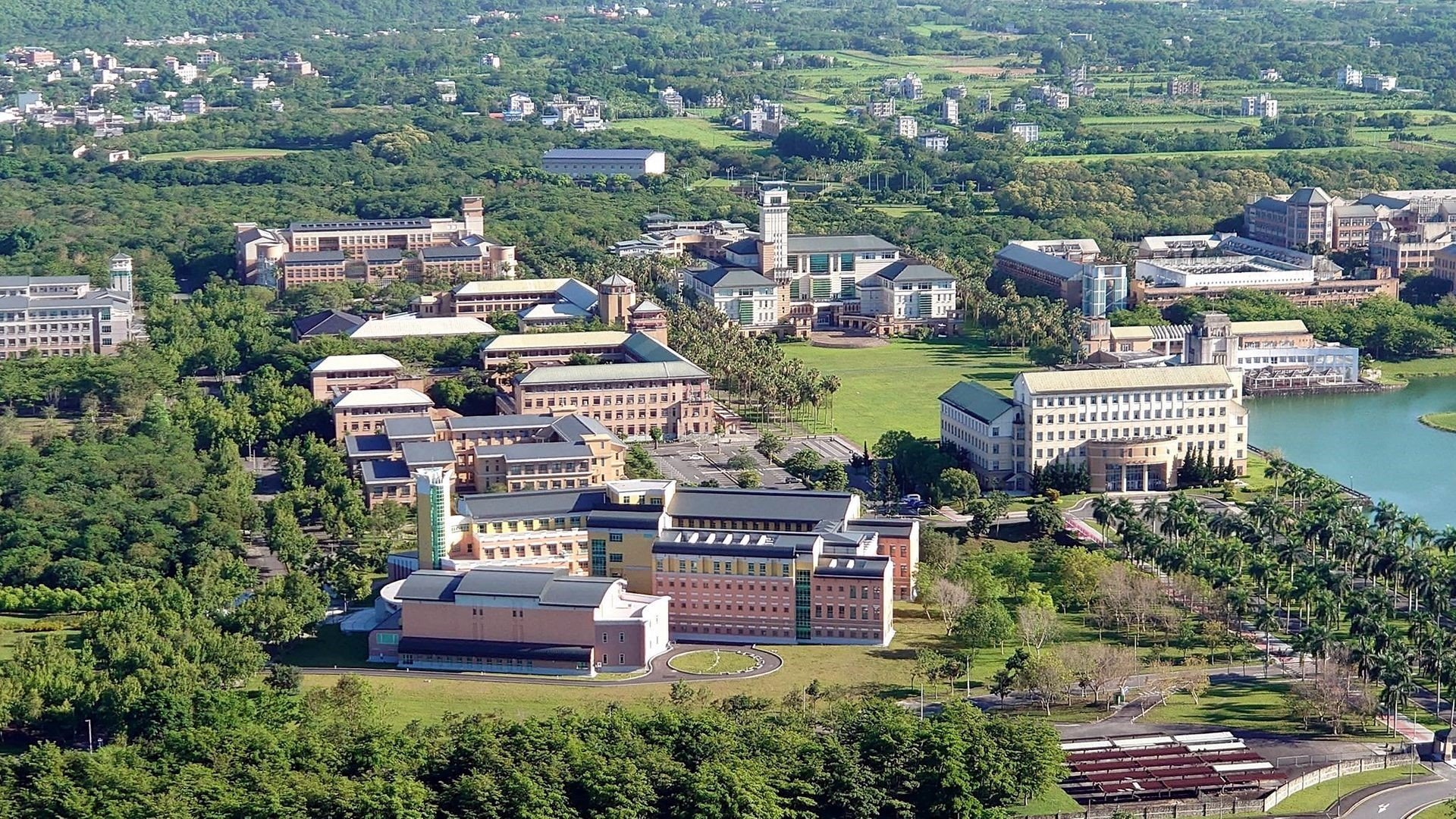
Campus view of National Dong Hwa University

The Meilun campus was the main campus of National Hualien University of Education before it was merged with NDHU. The 12.26-hectare (30.3-acre) campus is located in Meilun District of Hualien City, near Qixingtan Beach. In 2020, NDHU collaborated with Lee Yuen-Cheng, founder of Boston International Experimental Education Institution and an alumnus of NDHU, to establish the first international school on campus: Hualien International School.

=== Pingtung ===
The Graduate Institute of Marine Biology is based at the National Museum of Marine Biology and Aquarium (NMMBA) in Chechung Township in Pingtung County, standing in Kenting National Park and facing the Taiwan Strait in the west. It houses the National Museum of Marine Biology.

== Organization and administration ==
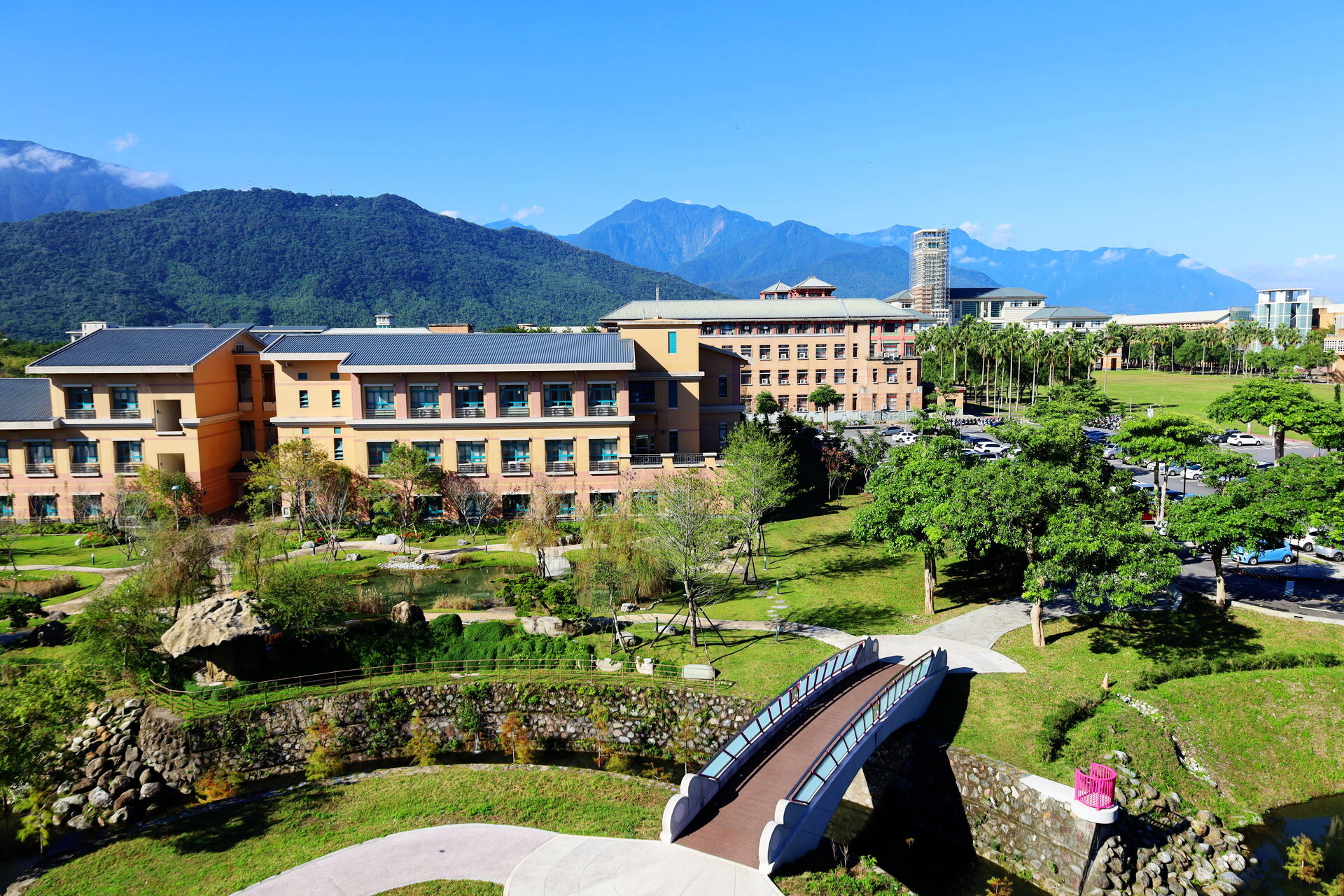
A view of Dong Lake and NDHU College of Humanities and Social Sciences

NDHU has over 10,000 students and confers undergraduate, master's and doctoral degrees in multiple fields. The university is organized into 39 departments, 56 graduate institutes, 8 colleges, and over 70 research centers.

=== Academic organizations ===
Faculties and schools	Founded
College of Humanities and Social Sciences	1995
College of Science and Engineering	1995
School of Management	1995
College of Indigenous Studies	2001
Hua-Shih College of Education	2005
College of The Arts	2005
College of Environmental Studies and Oceanography	2022
College of Huilan	2022

NDHU is organized into seven academic colleges and one undergraduate college: College of Humanities and Social Sciences (CHASS), College of Science and Engineering (CSAE), School of Management (SOM), Hua-Shih College of Education (HSCE), College of The Arts (ARTS), College of Indigenous Studies (CIS), College of Environmental Studies and Oceanography (CESO), and College of Huilan (CHL).

Within these colleges are "departments" and "graduate institutes", which either represent one academic discipline such as Computer Science, or assemble adjacent academic disciplines such as the Department of Tourism, Recreation, and Leisure Studies.

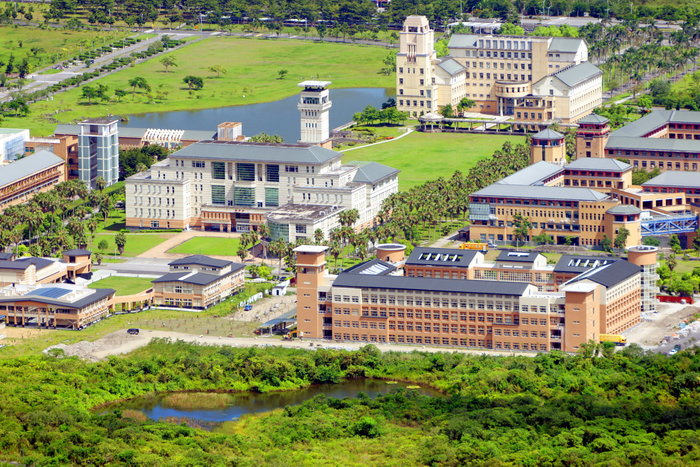
NDHU Campus View from Hwa Lake

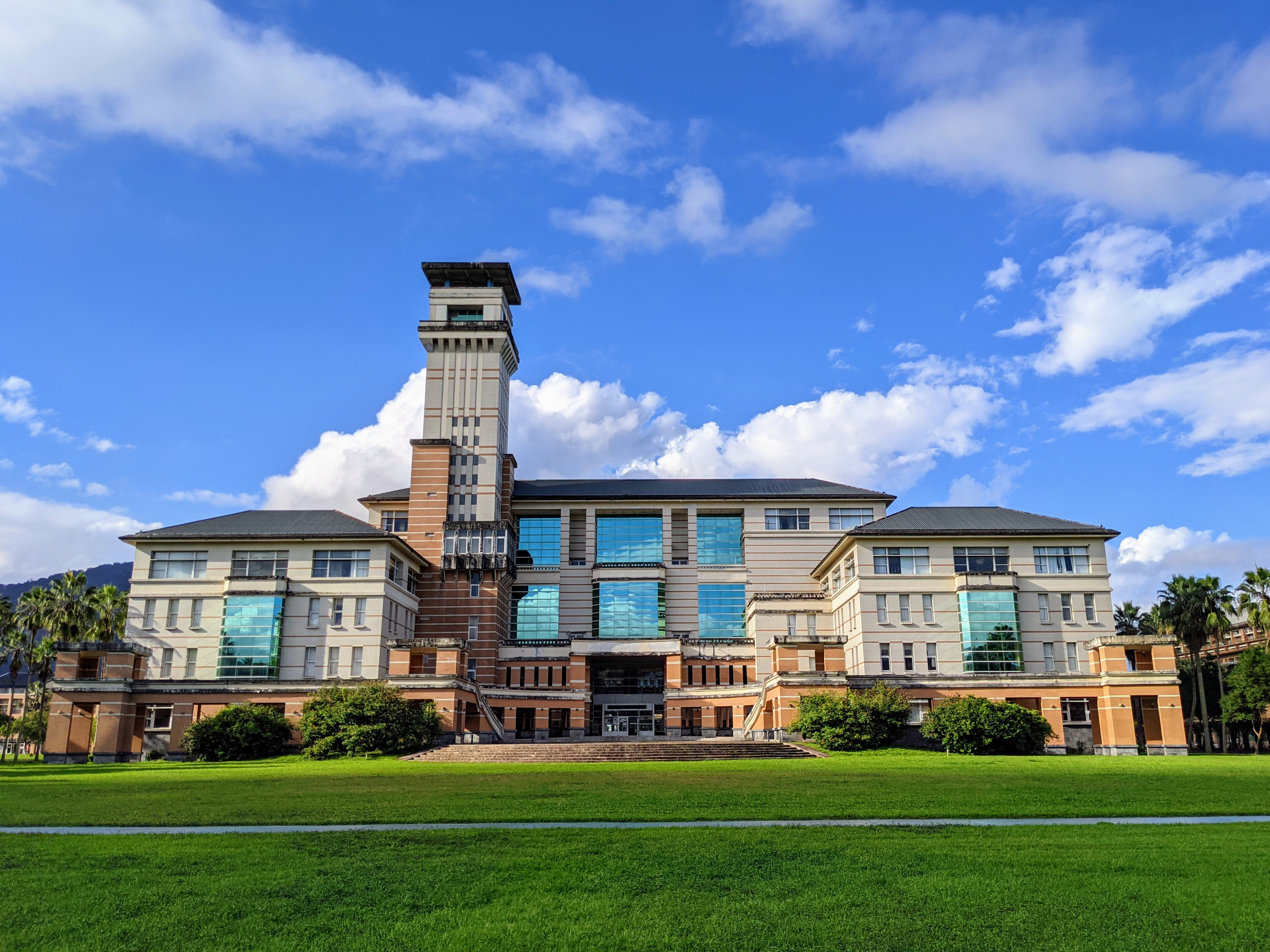
National Dong Hwa University Library

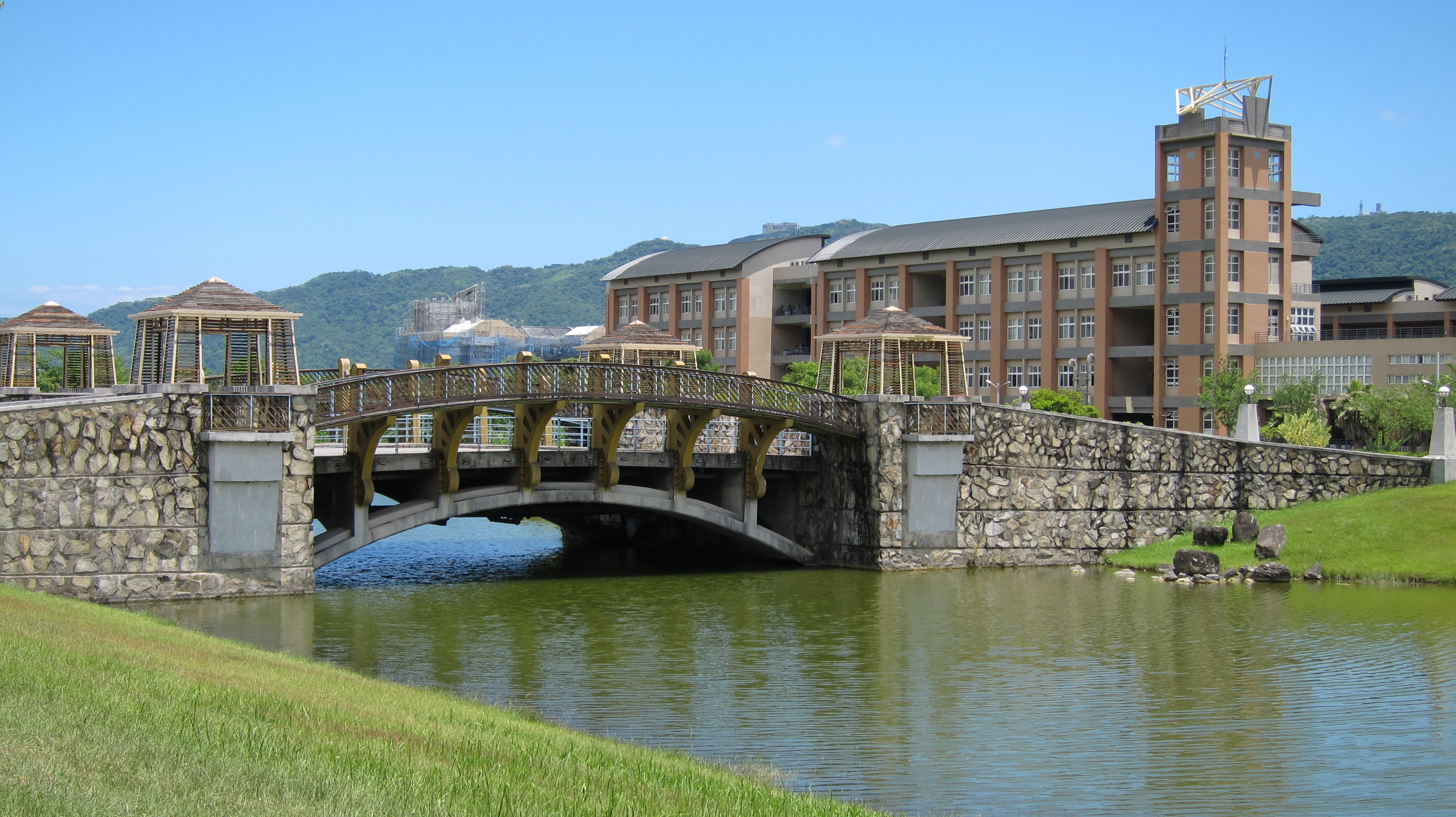
Dong Lake Bridge

==== College of Humanities and Social Sciences ====
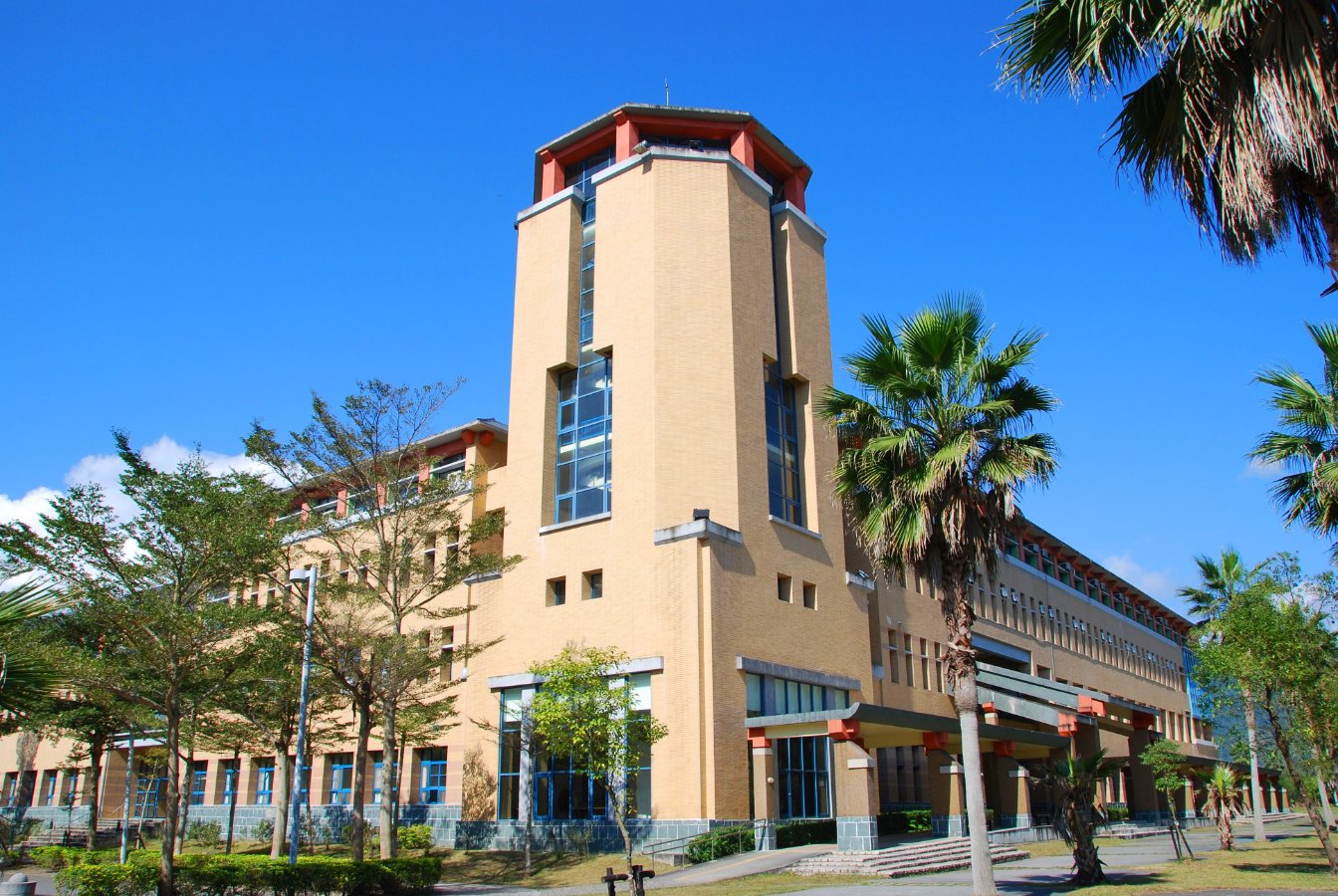
NDHU College of Humanities and Social Sciences Building II

The NDHU College of Humanities and Social Sciences was founded by Yang Mu, a professor at the University of Washington and the founding dean of Hong Kong University of Science and Technology.

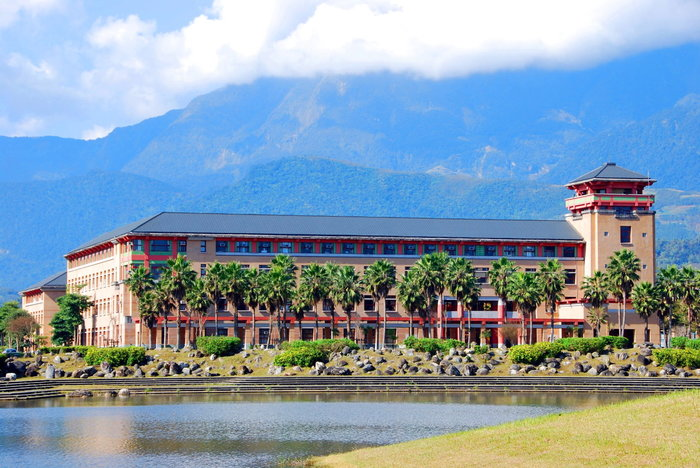
NDHU College of Humanities and Social Sciences Building I

The college offers four doctoral programs: a PhD in teaching Chinese as a second language (TCASL), a PhD in Asia-Pacific regional studies (APRS), a PhD in economics, and a PhD in Chinese literature.

==== College of Science and Engineering ====
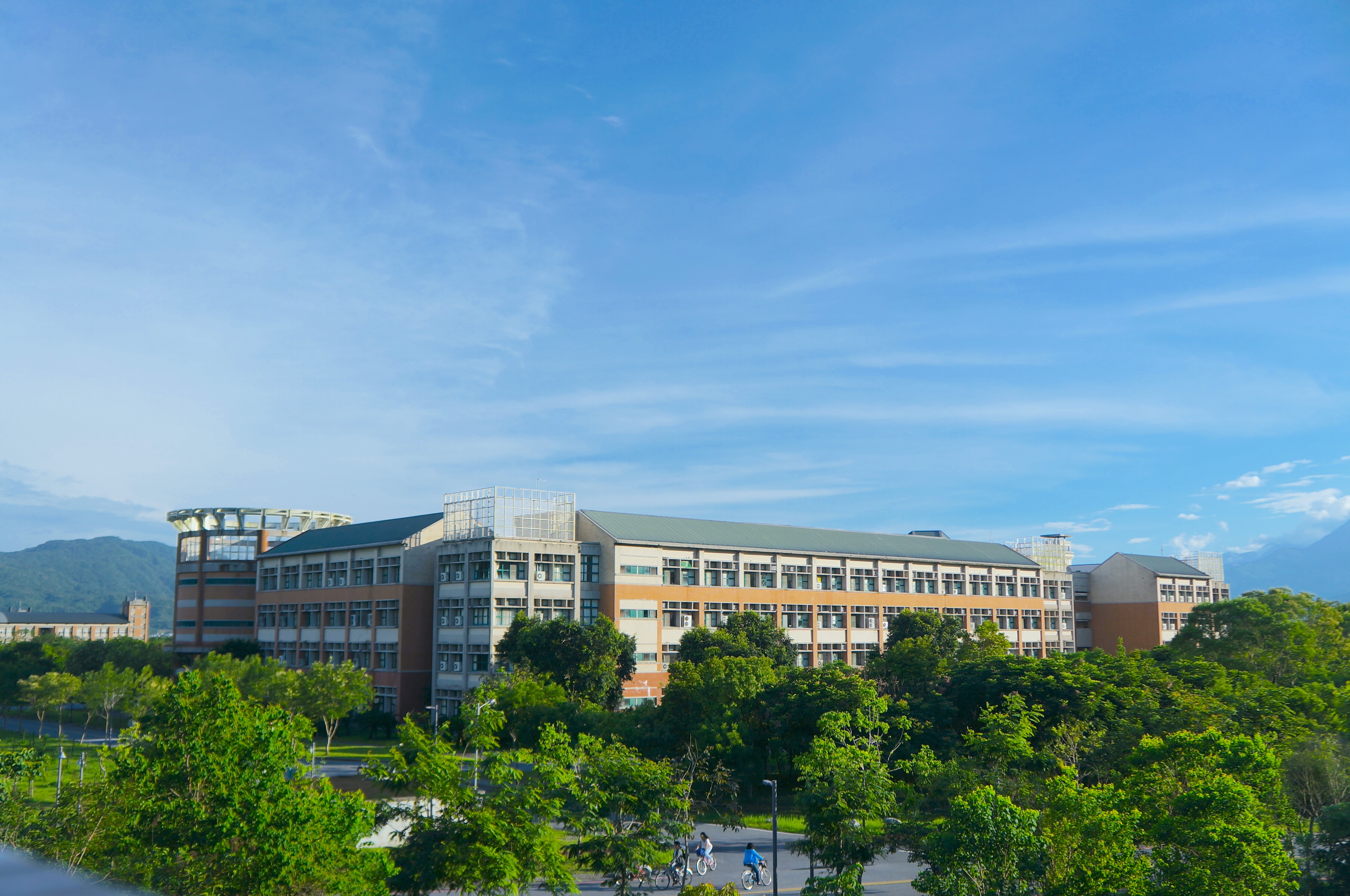
NDHU College of Science and Engineering Building II, the home to Engineering-related departments

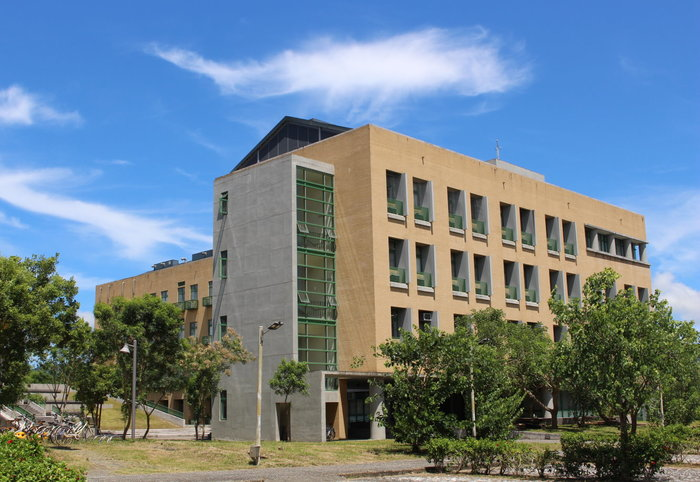
NDHU College of Science and Engineering Building III, where the Department of Biochemistry and Molecular Medicine is based.

The NDHU College of Science and Engineering was founded by Hsia Yu-Ping, a chair professor at the California Institute of Technology and Yale University.

The college has 8 departments: Applied Mathematics (AM), Physics (PHYS), Chemistry (CHEM), Biochemistry and Molecular Medicine (BMM), Electrical Engineering (EE), Computer Science and Information Engineering (CSIE), Materials Science and Engineering (MSE), and Opto-Electronic Engineering (OEE). The college has more than 40 undergraduate, graduate, and doctoral degree programs.

==== School of Management ====
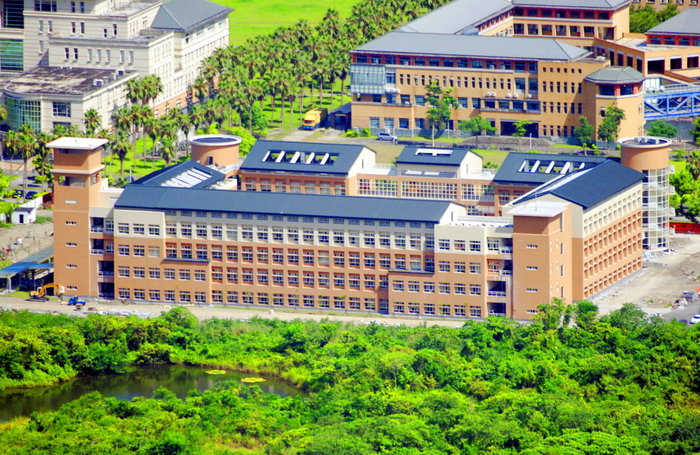
The overview of NDHU School of Management Building

The NDHU School of Management was founded as the Graduate Institute of Business Administration in 1994. It has six academic departments—Business Administration, International Business, Finance, Accounting, Information Management, Logistics Management—and a graduate institute of Tourism, Recreation, and Leisure Studies (TRLS). The college offers degree programs– undergraduate, MBA, MIM, EMBA, MSc, PhD, and dual degree with oversea partner universities.

==== Hua-Shih College of Education ====
The Hua-Shih College of Education traces its roots back to the Taiwan Provincial Hualien Normal School established in 1947. The school's PhD program has the second-most Indonesian graduates among all the programs in Taiwan and was the first institution in Taiwan to offer MEd and PhD degrees in multicultural education. The college become one of eight colleges at NDHU in 2008. It currently offers over 20 programs, including BEd, MEd, MSc, and PhD degrees in Curriculum and Instruction, Early Childhood Education, Educational Administration, Special Education, Physical Education and Kinesiology, Multicultural Education, and Science Education.

==== College of The Arts ====
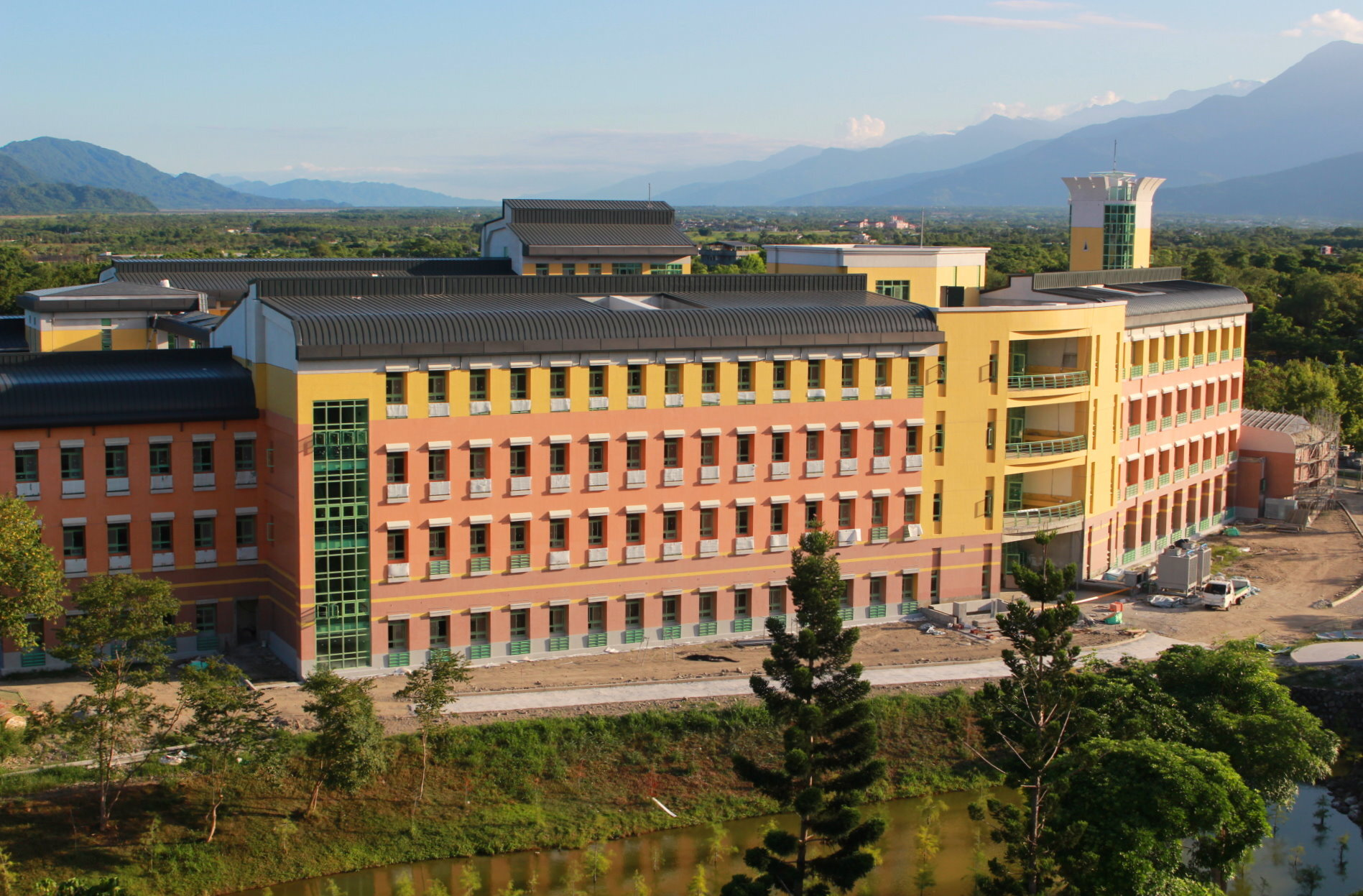
The Building of NDHU College of The Arts in 2020

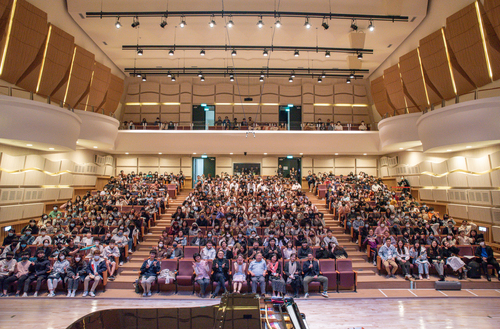
A view of NDHU Concert Hall

NDHU College of The Arts (Chinese: 國立東華大學藝術學院; ARTS) is the first art school to be established in Eastern Taiwan, which is organized into three departments — Music, Arts and Design, Arts and Creative Industry.

The college offers over 15 programs, including B.A., B.F.A., M.A., M.F.A., into Creative Design, Studio Art, Indigenous Art, Visual Art Education, Creative Industry Management, and Taiwan's 1st PhD in Interdisciplinary Arts. NDHU ARTS also offer Bachelor of Music and Master of Music into nine majors — Piano, Vocal Music, Choral Conducting, Violin, Viola/Cello, Flute/Clarinet, Percussion, and Taiwan's 1st Jazz & Jazz Vocal majors.

In 2025, QS World University Ranking ranked NDHU College of The Arts 201-260th in the world (4th in Taiwan) for Art & Design, holding the same statue with KU Leuven, University of Barcelona, and University of Illinois Urbana-Champaign.

==== College of Indigenous Studies ====
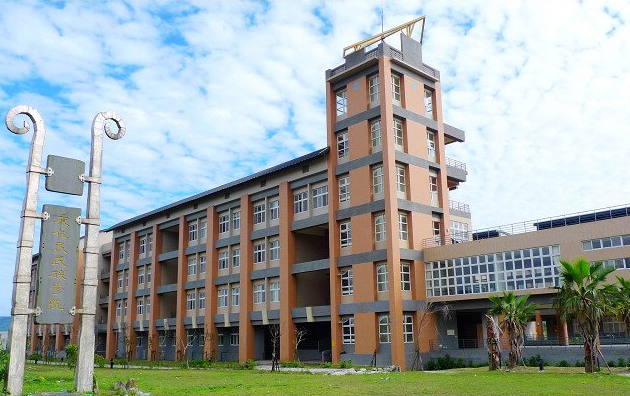
The Building of NDHU College of Indigenous Studies

NDHU College of Indigenous Studies (Chinese: 國立東華大學原住民民族學院; CIS) was first in Taiwan and most renowned institution for Indigenous Studies in Asia. Established in 2001, NDHU CIS traced its roots back to Graduate Institute of Ethnic Relations and Cultures in 1995, which was founded by Chiao Chien, Professor of Anthropology at Indiana University Bloomington and Founding Chair of Anthropology at Chinese University of Hong Kong.

NDHU CIS was the first institution in Taiwan to grant degree in Ethnic Relations and Cultures (ERC), Indigenous Arts, Indigenous Development, Indigenous Affair, Indigenous Social Work (ISW), and Indigenous Language and Communication (ILC), which offering over 10 programs- B.A., B.S.S., B.S.W., B.I.A., M.S.S, M.S.W. Ph.D. in these disciplines. The International Ph.D. in Indigenous Studies was established in 2023 for overseas students who seek to discover knowledge and culture of Taiwanese indigenous peoples.

==== College of Environmental Studies and Oceanography ====
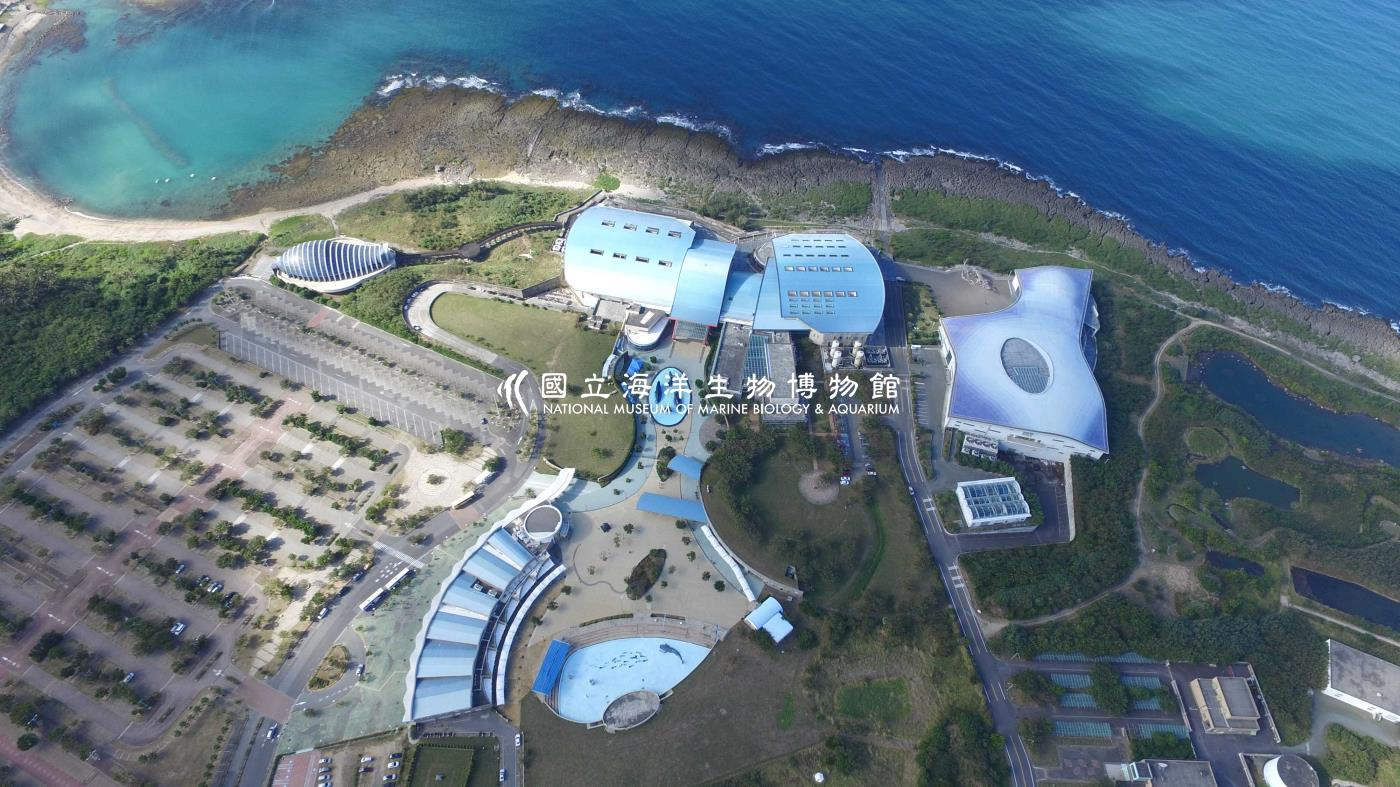
NDHU Graduate Institute of Marine Biology (IMB) is based at National Museum of Marine Biology and Aquarium (NMMBA).

NDHU College of Environmental Studies and Oceanography (Chinese: 國立東華大學環境暨海洋學院; CESO) was established in 2022 through the merger of College of Environmental Studies (CES) and College of Marine Sciences (CMS) to serve purpose of interdisciplinary trends of sustainability studies. The College of Environmental Studies (CES) was established in 2009 by merging five graduate institutes — Natural Resources and Management, Environmental Policy, Ecological and Environmental Education, Earth Science, and Biological Resources and Technology into a school of Environmental Studies. The College of Marine Sciences formerly was a graduate school at NDHU that was founded in 2005 as an academic collaboration with National Museum of Marine Biology and Aquarium (NMMBA) in Kenting National Park, which set the first record on academic collaboration between higher education and museum in Taiwan.

NDHU CESO emphasize on interdisciplinary collaborative approach in solving environmental and marine issues with its two department and graduate institute — Department of Natural Resources and Environmental Studies (NRES) and Graduate Institute of Marine Biology (IMB), and five research centers – Center for Interdisciplinary Research on Ecology and Sustainability (CIRES), Center for Disaster Prevention Research (CDPR), Environmental Education Center (EEC), Campus Center for the Environment (CCE), and Eastern Taiwan Earthquake Research Center (ETERC).

The college offers seven programs — BSc, MSc, PhD in Natural Resources and Environmental Studies (NRES), MSc in Marine Biotechnology, MSc in Marine Biodiversity and Evolutionary Biology, and PhD in Marine Biology. NDHU CESO with College of Humanities and Social Sciences (CHASS) and College of Indigenous Studies (CIS) to offer MSc program in Humanity and Environmental Science (HES), the first in Taiwan.

=== Affiliated schools ===
- National Dong Hwa University Experimental Primary School
- National Dong Hwa University Experimental Primary School Affiliated Kindergarten
- Affiliated Preschool of National Dong Hwa University

== Academics ==
=== Research ===
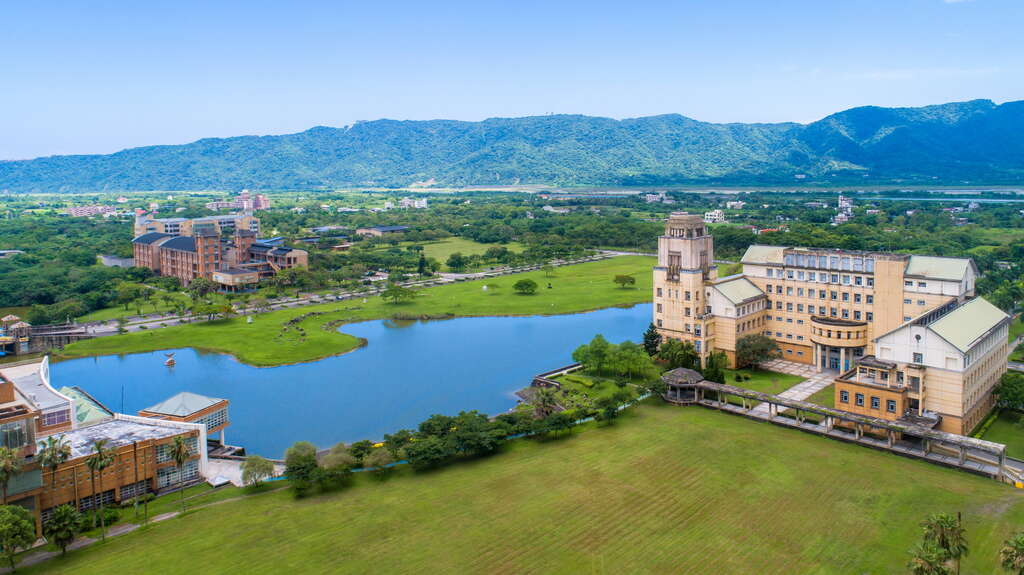
NDHU Dong Lake

NDHU faculty and researchers have included one International Member of National Academy of Sciences (NAS), four Fellows of Institute of Electrical and Electronics Engineers (IEEE), seven Fellows of Institution of Engineering and Technology (IET), one Fellow of British Computer Society (BCS), one Fellow of American College of Sports Medicine (ACSM), two Fellows of Optical Society of America (OSA). The university is ranked as 7th university in Taiwan with greatest research impact by CNCI Index, an evaluation undertaken by Ministry of Education (MOE).

=== Libraries ===
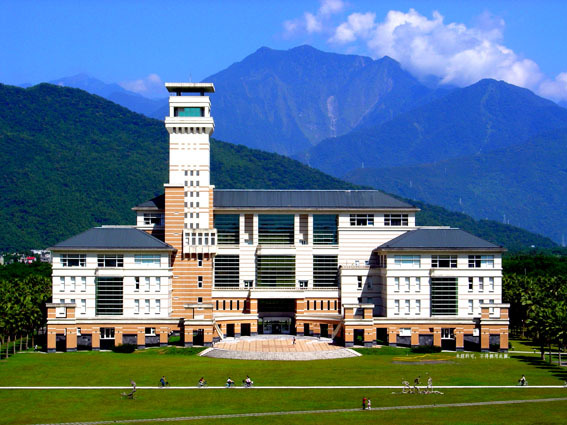
NDHU Main Library

National Dong Hwa University Library is the tallest building on campus. It holds over two million volumes in both Chinese and foreign languages and is the eighth-largest academic library in Taiwan. The university library is one of only two legal deposit university libraries, alongside National Taiwan University.

In addition to the University Library and its dependents, it has several specialized libraries; for example, the Yang Mu Library, established in 2016 in honor of the renowned literary figure Yang Mu, which was a gift from Tzu-Hsien Tung, Co-founder of ASUS, and houses all collections of Yang Mu's books, rare poetry collections, and manuscripts from the University of Washington, HKUST, Academia Sinica, and his own home. The Sinology Library was established in 2019 through donation from acclaimed sinologist Cheng Ching-mao, which houses a collection of over ten thousand Cheng's rare international and Japanese sinology books and historical materials.

=== Admission ===
Admission to the undergraduate program, Rift Valley Interdisciplinary Shuyuen (縱谷跨域書院), is one of the most selective undergraduate programs in Taiwan. For the Fall 2021 program students, NDHU only accepted of 7.1% applicants.

=== Rankings and reputation ===
- National Dong Hwa University rankings

Global – Overall
QS World	1001-1200 (2022)
RUR World	787 (2022)
THE World	1001–1200 (2025)
USNWR Global	1303 (2022)

National – Overall
QS National	15 (2022)
THE National	12 (2022)

In 2021, Times Higher Education World University Rankings by Subject ranked NDHU No.5 in Computer Sciences, No.8 in Engineering, and No.8 in Physical Sciences in Taiwan, the best ever position achieved by any university in Eastern Taiwan. ARWU Global Ranking of Academic Subjects ranked NDHU No.4 in Electrical & Electronic Engineering in Taiwan, which was only next to National Taiwan University (NTU), National Yang Ming Chiao Tung University (NYCU), and National Tsing Hua University (NTHU).

According to SCImago Journal Rank, NDHU is ranked 5th most innovative academic institution in Taiwan and 332th in the world.

According to Times Higher Education World University Ranking, NDHU is one of academic institutions with largest research impact for Computer Science (No.1 Citations in Taiwan, 149th in the world) and Engineering (No.3 Citations in Taiwan).

The University Ranking by Academic Performance ranked NDHU No.1 research impact in Taiwan for Information & Computer Science. The Academic Ranking of World Universities ranked NDHU No.5 in Taiwan for Electrical & Electronic Engineering (401–500 in the World) and No.5 in Taiwan for Hospitality & Tourism Management (101–150 in the World).

The SCImago ranked NDHU 5th for Oceanography, 7th for Plant Science, 8th for Aquatic Science, 8th for Medicine, 9th for Engineering, 10th for Geography and Planning. NDHU's MSS in Ethnic Relations and Cultures was selected as a Fulbright Program for its Taiwan's leading research in Indigenous Studies, which is funded by U.S. government.

== Student life ==
=== Student body ===
NDHU International student body 2024/25
1. Indonesia (26.4%)
2. Malaysia (16.3%)
3. Hong Kong (10.4%)
4. Vietnam (9.50%)
5. India (4.20%)
6. Mongolia (3.90%)
7. Eswatini (3.80%)
8. Thailand (2.90%)
9. Belize (2.40%)
10. Malawi (1.90%)
11. Philippines (1.80%)
12. Others countries (16.2%)

For the 2024/25 academic year, NDHU had a total full-time student body of 10,000, consisting of 7,600 undergraduate students and 2,400 postgraduates.

For the 2024/25 academic year, NDHU had one of Taiwan's largest international student bases, with 13.7% of the student body from 57 countries outside of Taiwan. The university was ranked Taiwan's 4th most internationalized university by Times Higher Education. NDHU boasts the largest number of students from Eswatini, Kyrgyzstan, Belize, Malawi, and Saint Vincent and the Grenadines, thanks to its exclusive partnership with the International Cooperation and Development Fund of the Ministry of Foreign Affairs for computer science program. This partnership provides full scholarships to elite students from Taiwan's diplomatic allies.

=== Teaching and learning ===
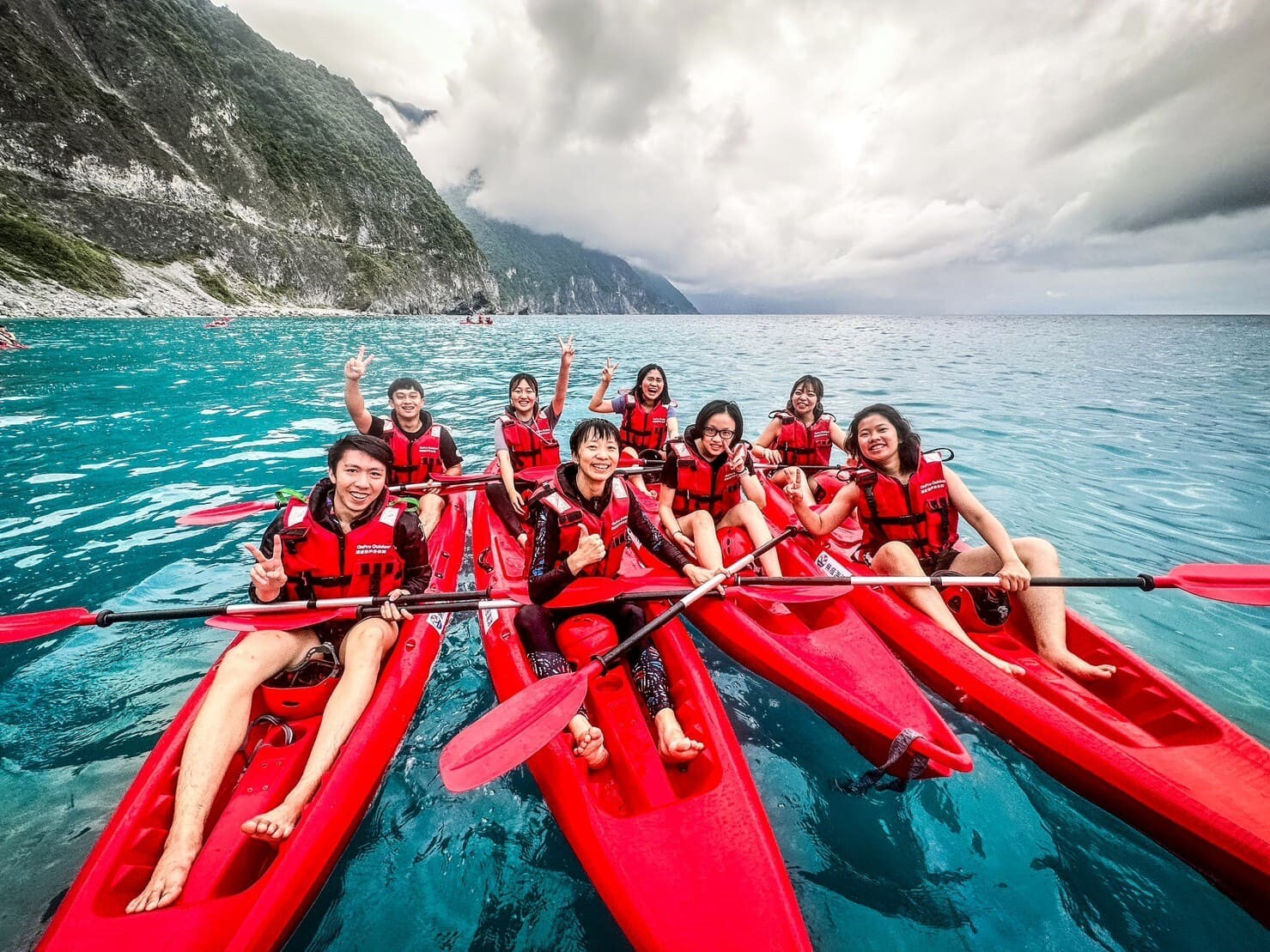
The Sustainability Education class at Qingshui Cliff

NDHU is a highly residential research university offering over 40 undergraduate majors and over 70 graduate degrees.

==== Modular Curriculum Model ====
The four-year, full-time undergraduate program runs Taiwan's first modular curricula with low barrier for double major and minor.

For 2022-year graduates, more than 40% and 20% of students obtained minor and double major degrees respectively, making it the second-highest and fourth-highest university in Taiwan.

=== Sports ===
NDHU has 14 varsity teams, covering 11 sports disciplines, including track and field, swimming, basketball, volleyball, soccer, badminton, softball, baseball, table tennis, lacrosse, tennis, taekwondo, triathlon, and orienteering. The coaching staff consists of professors from the Department of Physical Education and Kinesiology and instructors from Physical Education Center.

Chen Shih-Hsin, the first Taiwanese Olympic taekwondo gold medalist, served as NDHU's taekwondo coach, to train Olympic gold medalists. Wang Cheng-Pang, first Taiwanese Olympic silver medalist for Olympic archery team, was NDHU's archery coach, to train next Olympic medalists.

In the 2021 National Collegiate Athletic Games, NDHU achieved a record of 7 golds, 4 silvers, and 9 bronzes, ranking among the top five universities with the sport-related department. At the 2023 World University Games, multiple members of the NDHU Varsity Team were selected for the national team in track and field, swimming, and taekwondo.

=== Festival and Events ===
==== Dong Hwa Corner Art Festival ====
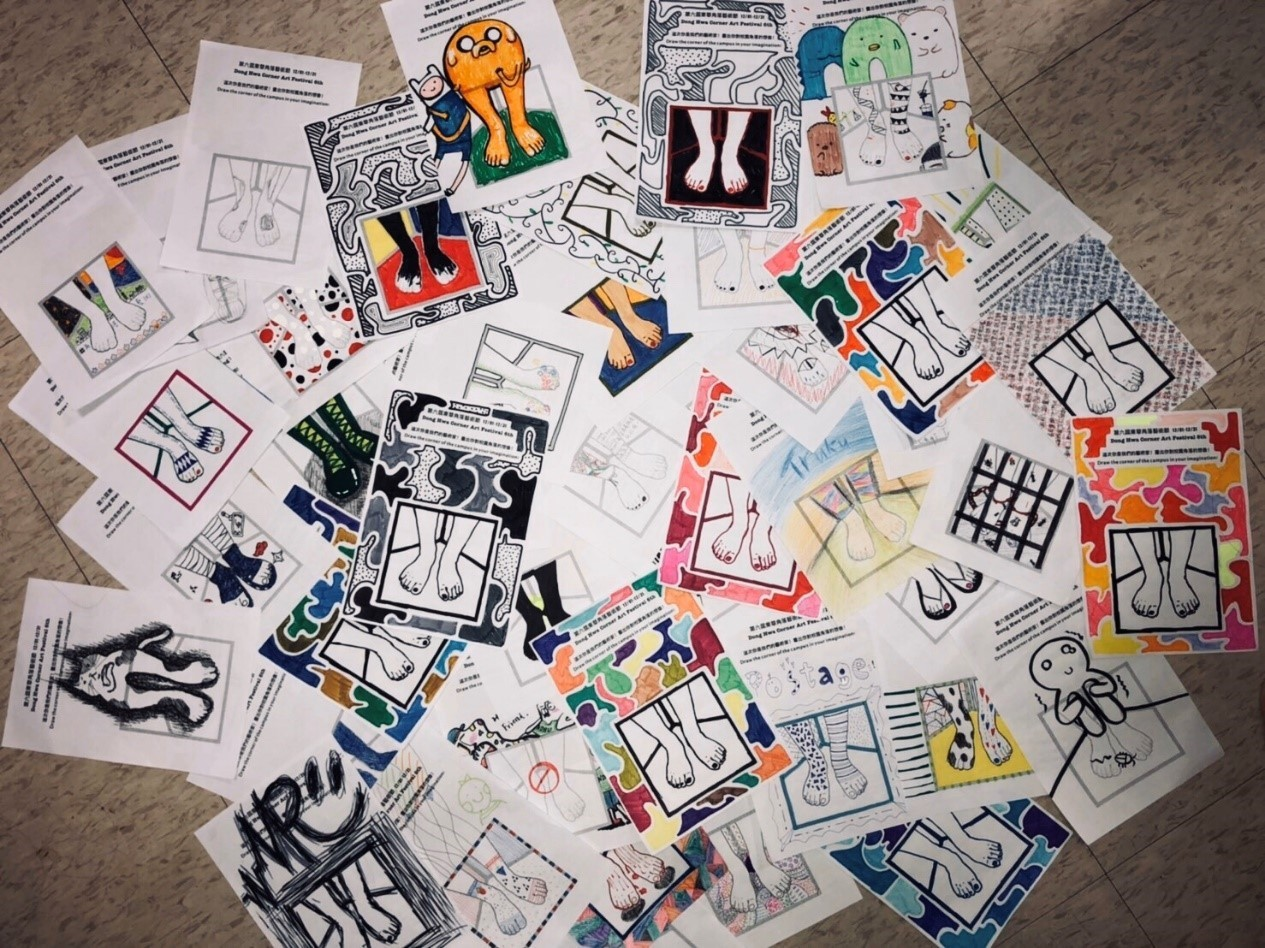
Various Brochure Designs of the 2019 Dong Hwa Corner Art Festival

The Dong Hwa Corner Art Festival was firstly co-curated in 2014 by Tien Ming-Chang, Professor of Art and Design, and the "Corner Art Team", a cross-disciplinary and intercollegiate team. The festival adopted the concept of "Corner, discover the beauty of art!" and collected hundreds of artworks from teachers and students across the NDHU. The artworks were displayed in every corner of the NDHU campus, with the main axis of "Living Museum" as the curatorial theme. A "NDHU Art Treasure Map" was designed to provide participants with a map to find the exhibits in various places, conveying the spirit of "art is around us".

== Global partnerships ==
=== Global Universities ===
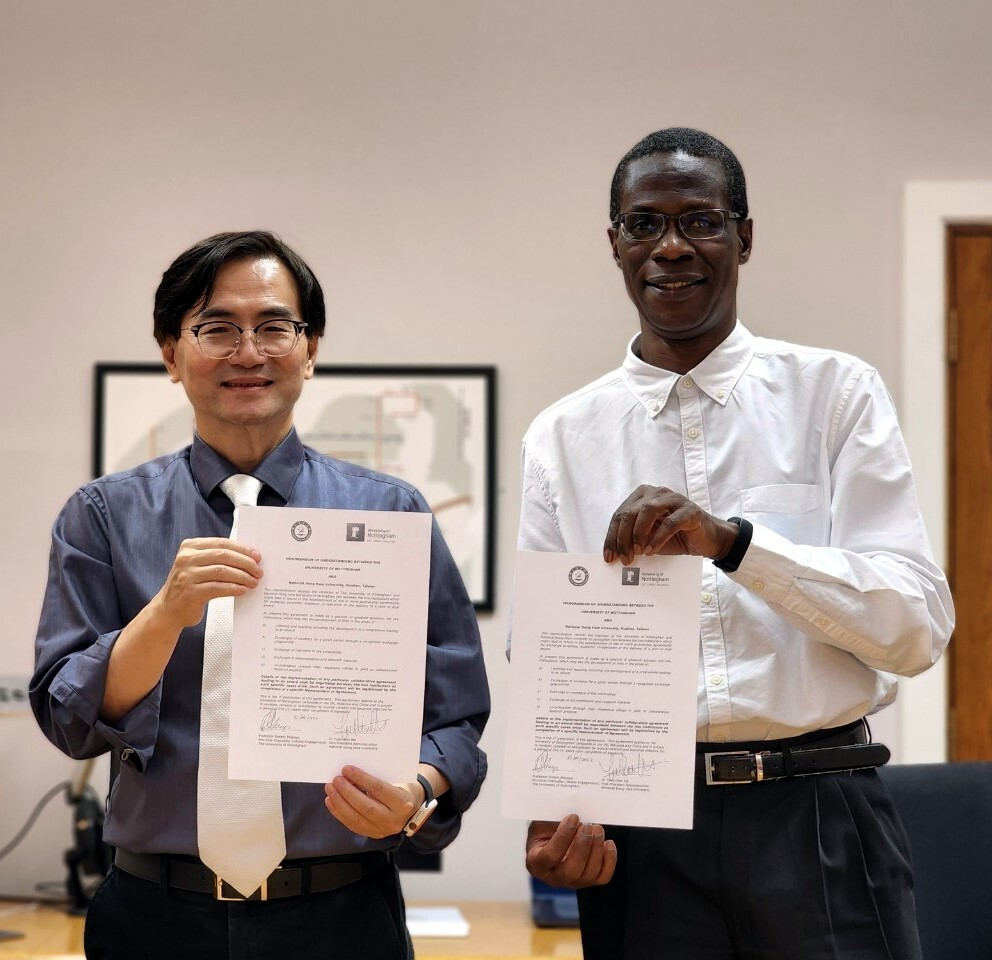
The vice-president Yuan-Ron Ma signed an agreement with University of Nottingham in 2022.

NDHU has academic partnerships in teaching and research with more than 500 universities across the Americas, Asia, Oceania, Europe, Middle East and Africa, including University of California, San Diego in San Diego, University of Wisconsin-Madison in Madison, Purdue University in West Lafayette, University of California, Irvine in Irvine, University of Edinburgh in Edinburgh, University of Nottingham in Nottingham, Uppsala University in Gotland, Peking University in Beijing, Fudan University in Shanghai, Nanjing University in Nanjing, Freie Universitaet Berlin in Berlin, Universitat de Barcelona in Barcelona, University of New South Wales in Sydney, Korea University in Sejong, Yonsei University in Seoul, Tohoku University in Sendai, Hokkaido University in Sapporo.

==== Dual Degree Programs ====
NDHU established over 10 dual degree programs throughout the world, including Dual-MSc in accounting with Tohoku University in Japan, Bachelor-Master with University of Essex in UK, Dual-PhD with UCLouvain in Belgium, Dual-MA with Hiroshima University in Japan, Dual-BBA with University of Technology Sydney in Australia, Dual-PhD with Macquarie University in Australia, and Bachelor-Master with Lincoln University in New Zealand, Dual-MBA with University of Texas Arlington in United States, Dual-MBA with ESC Rennes School of Business in France.

==== VIP Consortium ====
NDHU is one of Taiwan's three universities at VIP Consortium (Vertically Integrated Projects Consortium), a global alliance of higher education institutions with Vertically Integrated Projects (VIP) programs. The universities of consortium are across Europe, America, Asia, which was founded by several universities including University of New South Wales, Arizona State University, Georgia Institute of Technology, New York University, and University of Michigan.

=== Mandarin Education ===
NDHU Chinese Language Center is one of Taiwan's greatest impact institutions in Mandarin education. The university is selected as first round of 10 Mandarin Education Centers in "Taiwan Huayu BEST Program" by Ministry of Foreign Affairs (MOFA) and Ministry of Education (MOE) to jointly promote international cooperation program in Mandarin Education in United States and Europe. The university runs two oversea Chinese Language Centers at Howard University and Oakland University in the United States to bring Taiwanese Mandarin education to the partner universities. NDHU is also selected one of nine universities in "Taiwan-Europe Connectivity Scholarship" by MOFA to expand academic cooperation and Mandarin education with European universities and selected one of five universities in "Africa Elite Talent Cultivation Program" with National Taiwan University, National Taiwan Normal University by MOE to expand Taiwan's academic impact and Mandarin education to African.

=== Research Institutes ===
NDHU further establishes academic partnerships with global research institutes, including Academia Sinica, National Museum of Marine Biology and Aquarium, National Academy of Marine Research, National Center for Research on Earthquake Engineering, Central Geological Survey, Central Weather Bureau, European Union Centre in Taiwan, Defence Institute of Advanced Technology in India, Polish Academy of Sciences in Poland, Shanghai Academy of Social Sciences in China.

== Notable people ==
=== Alumni ===
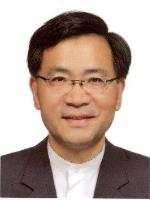
Deputy Mayor of Taipei Tsai Ping-kun (AA)

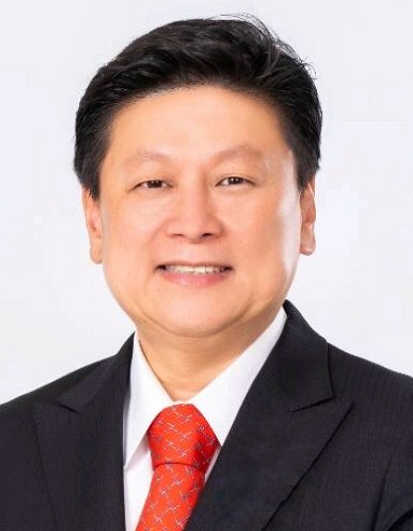
KMT Legislator Fu Kun-chi (MPA)

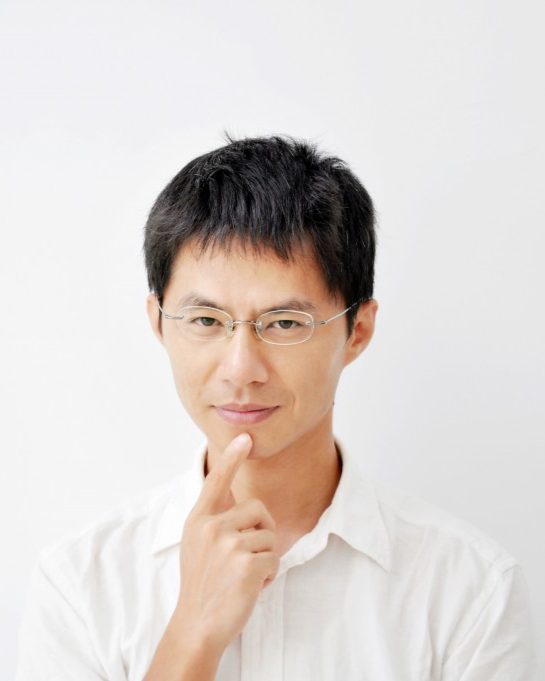
Novelist Gan Yao-ming (MFA)

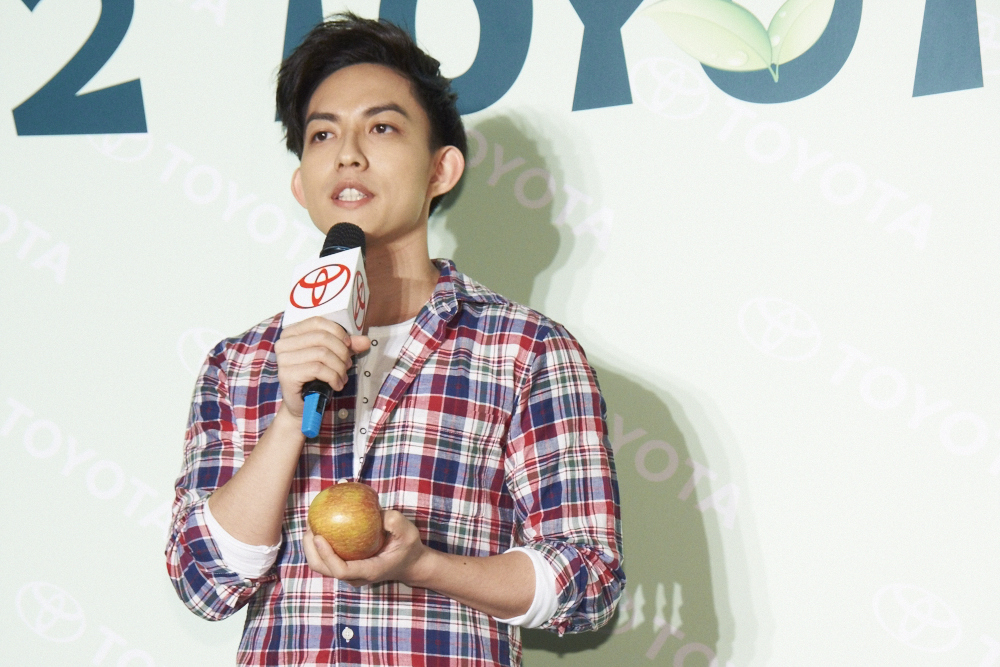
Singer Yoga Lin (BA)
- Yoga Lin (BA), famous Taiwan Pop Music Singer
- Gan Yao-ming (MFA), famous Taiwan novel and essay writer
- Fu Kun-chi (MPA), KMT caucus chair at Legislative Yuan and former Magistrate of Hualien County.
- Tsai Ping-kun (AA), Deputy Mayor of Taipei, former Deputy Mayor of Taichung, Deputy Minister of Culture, and Principal of Chien Kuo High School and Taichung First Senior High School.
- Wang Cheng-pang (AA), the member of Chinese Taipei's silver medal men's archery team at 2004 Summer Olympics.

=== Faculty ===
Notable present and past NDHU faculty include:

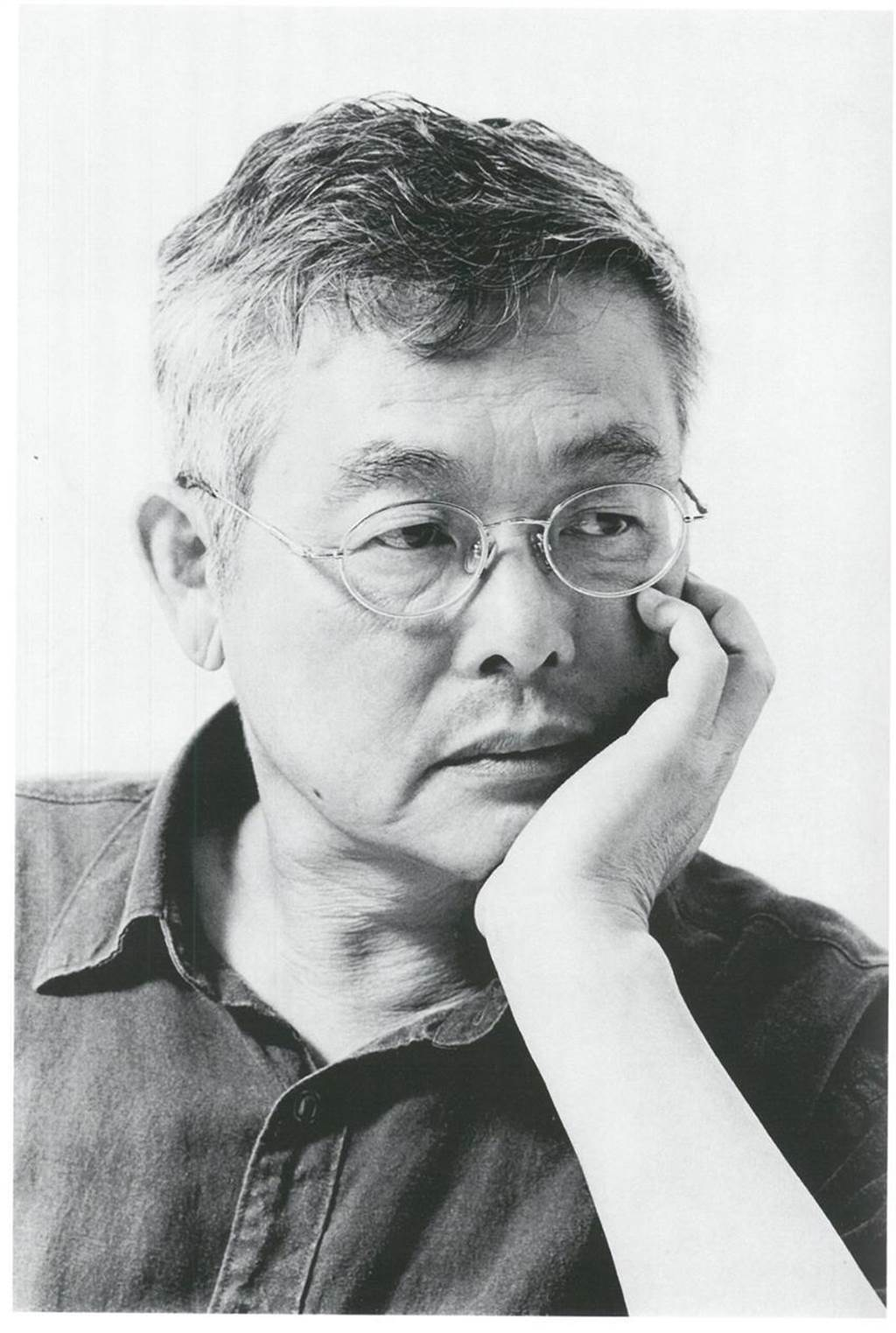
Poet Yang Mu

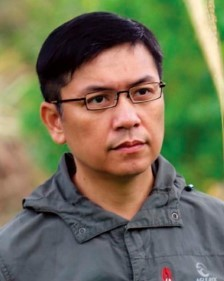
Writer Wu Ming-yi

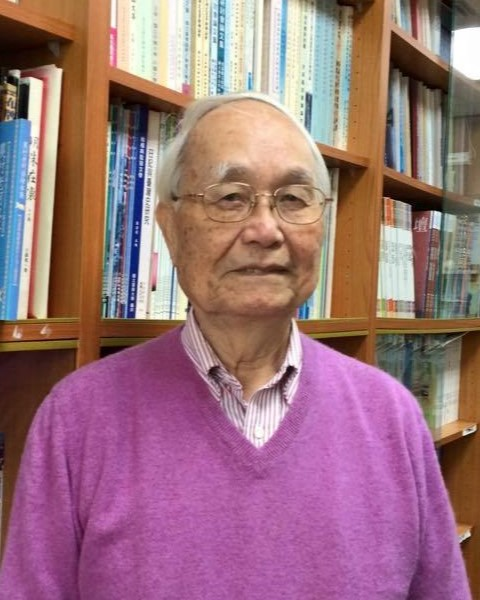
Sinologist Cheng Ching-mao

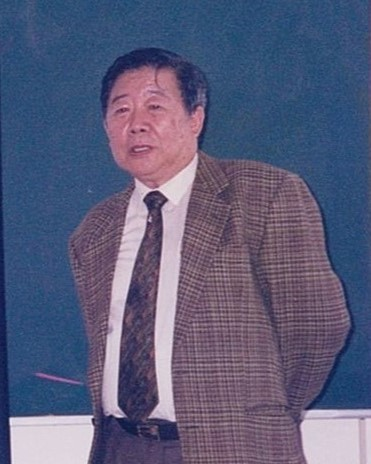
Anthropologist Chiao Chien

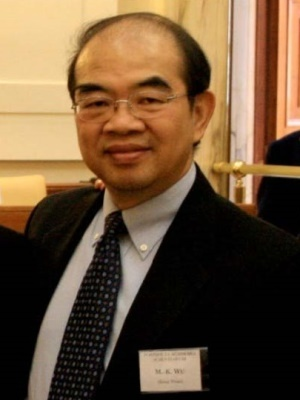
Physicist Maw-Kuen Wu

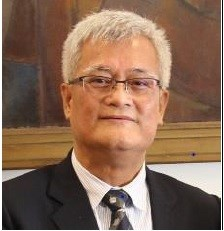
Chairperson of Council of Indigenous Peoples of Republic of China (Taiwan) Paelabang Danapan

=== University presidents ===
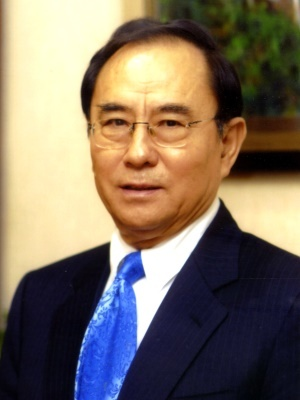
Mu Tzung-Tsann, economist and former vice president of Cal State LA

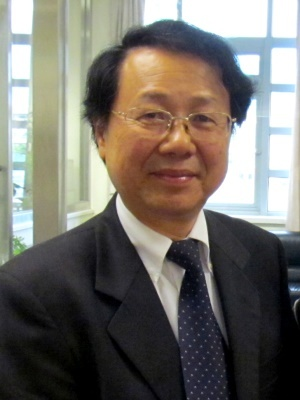
Hwang Wen-Shu, chemist

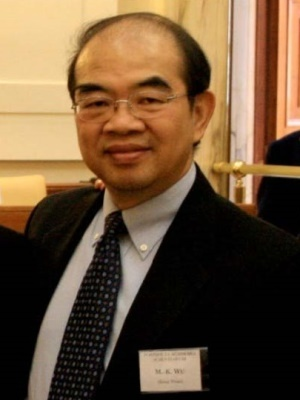
Wu Maw-kuen, physicist

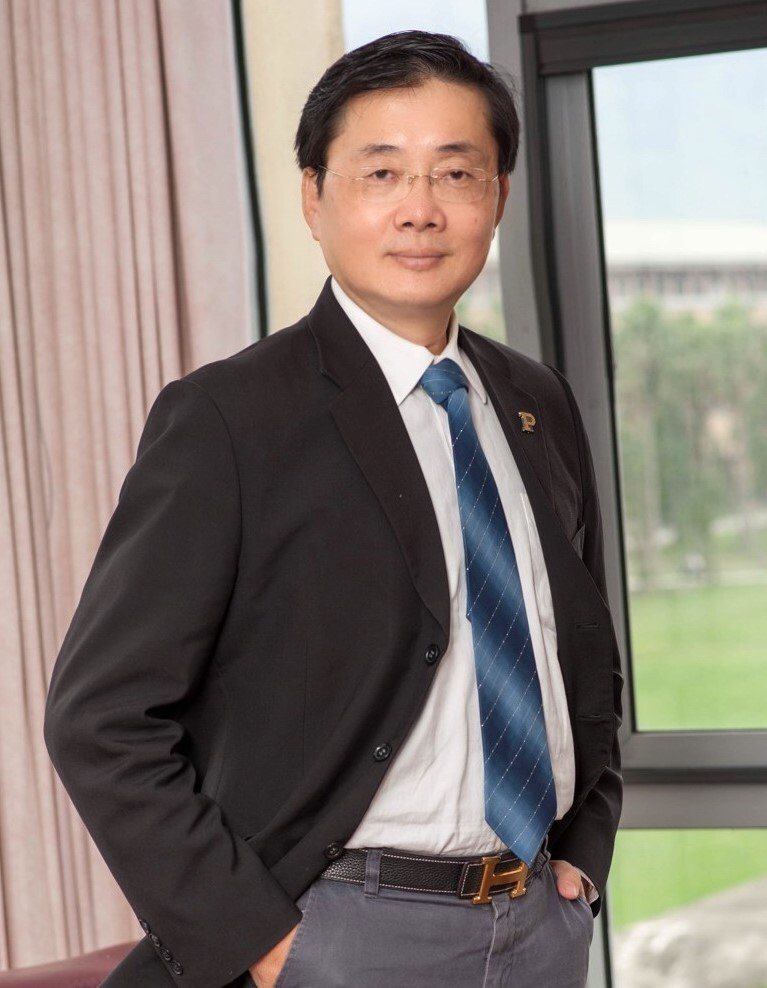
Chao Han-Chieh, computer scientist

== See also ==
- List of universities in Taiwan
- European Union Centre in Taiwan
