= Chiao Chien =

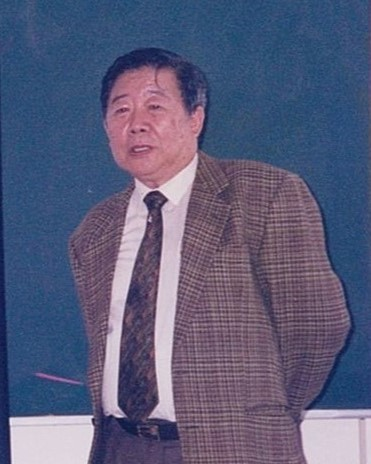
- Born: February 6, 1935; Taiwan
- Died: October 8, 2018 (aged 83); Taipei, Taiwan
- Education: National Taiwan University (BA, MA); Cornell University (PhD)
- Occupations: Anthropologist, Ethnologist
- Awards: National Chair Professorships (Taiwan); Lifetime Achievement Award in Anthropology (China)

Chiao Chien (Chinese: 喬健; pinyin: Qiáo Jiàn; February 6, 1935 – October 8, 2018) was a Taiwanese anthropologist and ethnologist. He was a professor of anthropology at Indiana University Bloomington and was instrumental in founding the Department of Anthropology at the Chinese University of Hong Kong (CUHK) in 1980, and later established the Graduate Institute of Ethnic Relations and Cultures at National Dong Hwa University (NDHU) in Taiwan in 1995.

Chiao was regarded as a leading figure in Chinese anthropology and was honored as a "National Chair Professorships" in Taiwan as well as with "Lifetime Achievement Award in Anthropology" in China.

== Early life and education ==
Chiao was born in 1935 to a prominent family originally from Shanxi province in mainland China. He spent his early years in China and Taiwan, attending high school in Taipei. In 1954, he enrolled at National Taiwan University (NTU) as a history major but switched to the new Department of Anthropology in his second year. At one point he was the only student in his anthropology cohort, studying under renowned scholars such as Li Ji and Ling Chun-sheng.

Chiao earned his B.A. in archaeology and anthropology from NTU in 1958 and an M.A. in anthropology in 1961. He then pursued doctoral studies in the United States, and in 1969 he obtained a Ph.D. in anthropology from Cornell University. His doctoral research included fieldwork among the Navajo people, reflecting his enduring interest in indigenous cultures.

== Academic career ==
After completing his doctorate, Chiao joined the anthropology faculty of Indiana University Bloomington in 1966. He taught at Indiana University for a decade, becoming an associate professor and focusing on sociocultural anthropology. In the early 1970s, Chiao moved to Hong Kong and in 1976 began teaching at Chinese University of Hong Kong’s sociology department. He was a key figure in establishing anthropology as a discipline in Hong Kong. In 1980, he founded the Department of Anthropology at the Chinese University of Hong Kong and served as its first chair until 1991. He was appointed a chair professor of anthropology (the CUHK’s first chair professor in anthropology) and remained on the CUHK faculty until his retirement from that university in 1994.

In 1995, Chiao returned to Taiwan to establish the Graduate Institute of Ethnic Relations and Cultures (Chinese: 族群關係與文化研究所) at National Dong Hwa University College of Humanities and Social Sciences. He served as the institute’s founding director from 1995 to 2000 and was a full professor in the institute through 2004. Chiao played a pivotal role in building NDHU’s programs in indigenous and ethnic studies. He was instrumental in the planning of NDHU College of Indigenous Studies, which traces its roots to the institute he founded and served as Director of Preparatory Office. During his career at NDHU, he served as "National Chair Professorships" from 2003 to 2006, which is one of highest academic honor in Taiwan and served as Founding Chair of Advanced Forum of Anthropology (Chinese: 人類學高級論壇) that is China's highest academic organization for anthropology. Chiao retired from academic career in 2005 and was named Professor Emeritus of NDHU College of Indigenous Studies that year.

Throughout his career, Chiao also fostered anthropological research and collaboration beyond his home institutions. Notably, he founded the "Hong Kong Anthropological Society" (Chinese: 香港人類學會) in 1978 and served as its first president. In 1986, he co-founded the "International Yao Studies Association" (Chinese: 國際瑤族研究學會), reflecting his research interest in the Yao (Iu Mien) people, and served as its inaugural president. In 1994, Chiao helped establish a center for North China cultural studies at Shanxi University in his native Shanxi, serving as its honorary director. He was also a visiting or honorary professor at several institutions, including Minzu University of China and Shanxi University (both in 1990).

== Research and contributions ==
Chiao Chien's scholarly work spanned the cultural anthropology and ethnology of both East Asia and indigenous peoples elsewhere. He conducted extensive fieldwork over six decades, studying a wide range of ethnic groups and communities. These included indigenous Austronesian peoples in Taiwan, minority nationalities in China (such as the Yao people), rural “bottom society” communities in China, as well as Native American groups in the United States (notably the Navajo). His comparative perspective led him to explore links between Asian and American indigenous cultures.

Chiao was a prolific author and editor. He published over thirty books and monographs, and nearly one hundred academic papers in Chinese and English. Many of his works focused on ethnic relations, social organization, ritual and religion, and the continuity of traditional cultures. For example, his doctoral dissertation, The Continuity of Tradition: Navajo and Chinese Patterns, examined Navajo society in comparative perspective. He also co-edited influential volumes such as Ethnicity and Ethnic Groups in China (with Nicholas Tapp, Professor at Australia National University). Chiao's writings and mentorship helped shape the development of anthropology in the Chinese-speaking world, bridging academic communities in Taiwan, Hong Kong, China, and abroad.

== Honors and legacy ==
Chiao was widely respected as a pioneer of anthropology in greater China. In Taiwan, the Ministry of Education named him a National Chair Professorships (Chinese: 國家講座教授) in 2003–2006 in recognition of his academic achievements. In Hong Kong, he had been appointed CUHK’s first Chair Professor of Anthropology in 1994. He also received numerous honors in later years: in 2011, he was awarded the inaugural “Lifetime Achievement Award in Anthropology” at Advanced Forum of Anthropology (人類學高級論壇), recognizing over half a century of field research and contributions to Chinese anthropology. In 2016, Fudan University in Shanghai honored him with the Golden Cong Lifetime Achievement Award for anthropology.

Chiao Chien is often regarded as one of the leading anthropologists of the Chinese-speaking world. Taiwanese academic sources have described him as having some of the richest field experience among his peers, comparing him to earlier generation giants like Li Ji, Wu Wenzao, Lin Yaohua, Fei Xiaotong, and Li Yih-yuan. His dedication to on-the-ground research and his humanistic approach to understanding cultures made him an influential teacher and scholar. He mentored numerous students who went on to become anthropologists, and he helped build institutional networks for anthropological scholarship across Taiwan, Hong Kong, and China.

Chiao died on October 8, 2018, in Taipei at the age of 83. The news of his passing was met with tributes from the academic community in Taiwan, Hong Kong, and China, commemorating his lifelong contributions to anthropology and ethnology.

== Selected works ==
- Ethnicity and Ethnic Groups in China (co-edited with Nicholas Tapp). Hong Kong: Chinese University Press, 1989.
- The Field of Anthropological Study (人類學的學術視野). Taipei: Linking Publishing, 1992. – collection of essays on anthropological theory and method.
- Continuity and Change: Studies of the Yao People (連續與變遷：瑤族研究). Guiyang: Guizhou People's Press, 1997. – edited volume on Yao (Iu Mien) ethnography.
