= The Reporter (Taiwan) =

Taiwanese non-profit news organization

- Native name: 報導者
- Editor: Sherry Lee (李雪莉)
- Director: Huang Jong-tsun
- Format: online
- Founder: Tzu-Hsien Tung
- Founded: 16 December 2015
- Company: The Reporter Foundation
- Country: Taiwan
- Based in: Zhongshan, Taipei
- Language: Chinese
- Website: www.twreporter.org

The Reporter (Chinese: 報導者; pinyin: Bàodaǒzhě) is an independent non-profit news organization based in Taiwan. Launched in December 2015, the site focuses on investigative journalism. It is a member of the Global Investigative Journalism Network.

== Organization ==
The Reporter is independently owned by The Reporter Foundation which is overseen by a board of 11 members, directed by Huang Jong-tsun, who was the Minister of Education from 2002 to 2004. The media outlet employs about 25 full-time staff. The editor-in-chief is Sherry Lee (李雪莉), who previously worked as an editor at CommonWealth Magazine.

The Reporter was founded by a NT$5 million (US$160,000) donation from Tzu-Hsien Tung, co-founder of Asus. It relies solely on public donations for its operations. As of October 2017, it has about 400 regular donors from which it raises about US$200,000 annually. It raises additional revenue by organizing workshops at local universities.

== Coverage ==
The first major story from The Reporter was its report on labor abuses and human trafficking in the Taiwanese fishing industry in January 2017. It won several awards for this report, including the Award for Excellence in Human Rights Reporting, Information Graphics, and Investigative Reporting from the 2017 Society of Publishers in Asia (SOPA) Awards and the 2016 Chinese Multimedia Award from the Human Rights Press Awards.

In response to its 2022 investigation on the use of foreign students as cheap labor, Democratic Progressive Party legislator Fan Yun called for the Ministry of Education to put an end to the practice.
