= Pan Shu (psychologist) =

Chinese psychologist (1897–1988)

- 潘菽
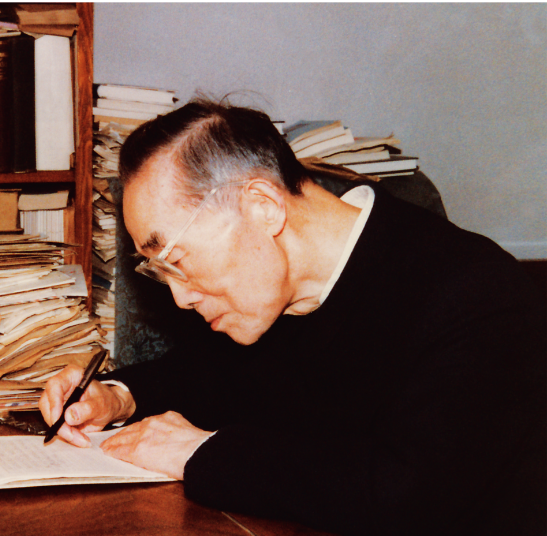
- Pan Shu, c. 1980s
- Born: Pan Younian; 13 July 1897; Luping, Yixing, Jiangsu, Qing China
- Died: 26 March 1988 (aged 90)

Academic background
- Education: Peking University; Indiana University; University of Chicago
- Doctoral advisor: Harvey A. Carr

Academic work
- Discipline: Psychologist
- Sub-discipline: Theoretical psychologist
- Institutions: Nanjing University, Chinese Academy of Sciences

Pan Shu
- Chinese: 潘菽
Transcriptions
Standard Mandarin
- Hanyu Pinyin: Pān Shū
- Wade–Giles: Pan1 Shuh1

Pan Shu (13 July 1897 – 26 March 1988) was a Chinese psychologist. Born in Yixing, Jiangsu, he studied philosophy at Peking University from 1917 to 1920, before he traveled to the United States to attend Indiana University and the University of Chicago. Initially focused on education, he began studying psychology, achieving his doctorate in 1926. Upon his return to China, he became a professor at what would become Nanjing University and oversaw the formation of a unified psychology department. He became president of the university in 1951, before transferring alongside its psychology department to the Chinese Academy of Sciences (CAS). Pan served as the first president of the reestablished Chinese Psychological Society and developed a theory of psychology influenced by Marxism. When psychological research was repressed during the Cultural Revolution, Pan continued it in secret. He was active in the reconstruction of the field during the late 1970s. He continued to serve as the president of the Chinese Psychological Society until 1984, when he became the society's honorary president. He continued to write until his death.

== Biography ==
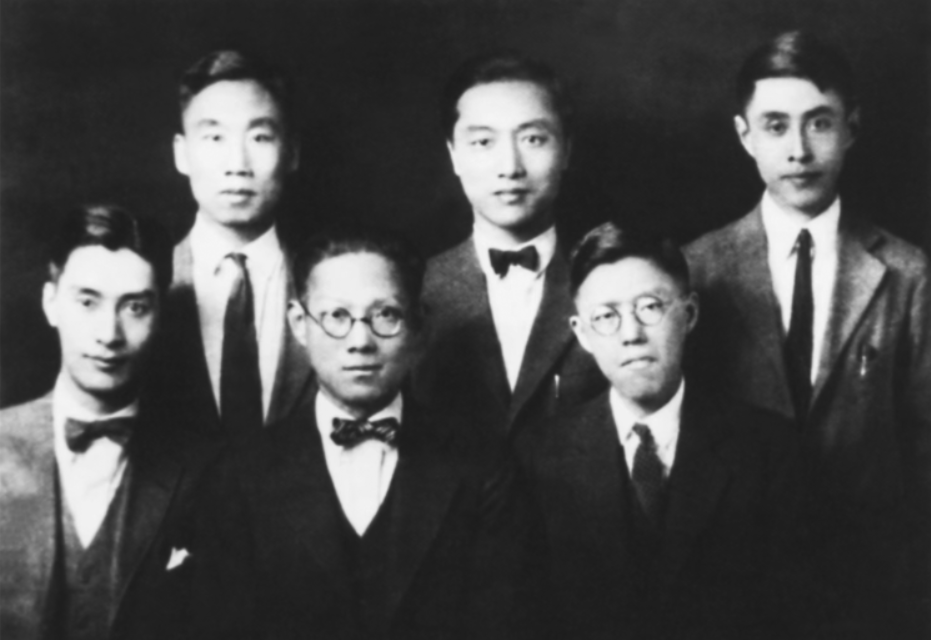
Pan Shu (center, back row) with other Chinese exchange students at the University of Chicago

On 13 July 1897, Pan Shu was born Pan Younian in the village of Luping in Yixing, Jiangsu. His courtesy name was Shuishu. He was admitted to the philosophy department of Peking University in 1917, where he was influenced by the works of the American philosopher and psychologist John Dewey. After his graduation in 1920, the Jiangsu province administration sponsored him to study abroad; he entered Indiana University the following year.

Pan initially studied education but, influenced by discussions with Chinese psychology students Cai Qiao and Guo Renyuan, switched his focus to psychology. After receiving his master's in 1923, Pan entered the University of Chicago, where he studied under Harvey A. Carr. While in the United States, he studied the perception of Chinese characters by Americans. He was awarded his doctorate in 1926, and returned to China the following year.

=== Early academic career ===
Soon after his return, Pan was appointed as an associate professor at National Central University in Nanjing. Psychology instruction at the university was initially divided into science and education-based units under the science faculty; in 1932, these were unified into a single psychology department under the education faculty, as more education students sought to study psychology. Pan was promoted to a professor and head of the new psychology department less than six months after joining the university. In 1945, he co-founded the Chinese Association of Scientists while in Chongqing.

Pan taught over ten courses, eschewing preexisting textbooks in favor of composing his own course materials. In 1949, the university was reorganized as Nanjing University, and Pan was appointed the chairman of its administrative committee. In 1951, leadership by committee was scrapped, and he became the president of the university. He was elected as the first president of the Chinese Psychological Society after its reestablishment in 1955; (Note: The Chinese Psychological Society was founded in 1921 but was essentially nonexistent during the Second Sino-Japanese War and its aftermath.) he would be reelected to the position for three terms. Pan traveled to the Soviet Union in 1949 for commemorations of the 100th birthday of Russian psychologist Ivan Pavlov. During the mid-1950s, Pan was part of a delegation of Chinese psychologists sent to East Germany.

=== Cultural Revolution and aftermath ===
Many Chinese universities shuttered their psychology departments during the early 1950s, with specialists pivoting to other fields. After encouragement by his brother Pan Zinian, Pan studied Marxism and began to incorporate Marxist-Leninist principles into his psychological theory. From 1955 to 1956, Nanjing's psychology department merged with the Psychology Research Office of the Beijing-based Chinese Academy of Sciences (CAS). Pan joined the academy and opted to move the Nanjing department to Beijing, forming the CAS Institute of Psychology. During the 1950s and 60s, he elaborated on the goals and subject of psychological research, describing it as an intermediary between the natural and social sciences which possesses aspects of both.

Government repression of psychology as a field worsened during the Cultural Revolution. Communist activist Yao Wenyuan, writing in the People's Daily, attacked the field, accusing it of being overly theoretical and insufficiently contextualized. The Chinese Psychological Society and psychology as an area of academic study were repressed during the revolution. Pan continued to write psychological theory in secret, compiling a 500,000 word draft titled Psychological Digest. In 1984, after the end of the Cultural Revolution, this was published as Notes on Psychology. The CAS Institute of Psychology was reformed in June 1977, and Pan was restored to his post as its director. He presided over the National Psychology Discipline Planning Symposium held in Pinggu that August. During the early 1980s, he published a number of books based on material he had composed in secret during the revolution. He continued to serve as the president of the Chinese Psychological Society until 1984, after which he became the society's honorary president. He continued to write until his death on 26 March 1988. Among his last works was an evaluation of Abraham Maslow's theories. Statues of Pan Shu were posthumously erected at Nanjing University and in his hometown of Yixing, Jiangsu.
