= Acta Psychologica Sinica =

- Discipline: Psychology
- Language: Chinese
- Edited by: Li Shu

Publication details
- History: 1956–present
- Publisher: Science Press
- Frequency: Monthly

Standard abbreviations
- ISO 4: Acta Psychol. Sin.
- NLM: Xin Li Xue Bao

Indexing
- CODEN: SLHPAW
- ISSN: 0439-755X
- LCCN: 92645072
- OCLC no.: 224544655

Links
- Journal homepage; Online access; Online archive

Acta Psychologica Sinica (also known as Xin Li Xue Bao) is a monthly peer-reviewed Chinese-language scientific journal of psychology. It was established in 1956 and is published by Science Press. It is co-sponsored by the Chinese Psychological Society, the Institute of Psychology of the Chinese Academy of Sciences, and the Department of Psychology at the Chinese University of Hong Kong. According to the Chinese Society of Periodicals, it is the oldest and most influential Chinese-language psychology journal. Its publication was halted from 1966 until 1979 due to pressure from the Gang of Four. The current editor-in-chief is Li Shu (Chinese Academy of Sciences).
