= Cheng Ching-mao =

Taiwanese sinologist and translator (1933–2025)

- 鄭清茂
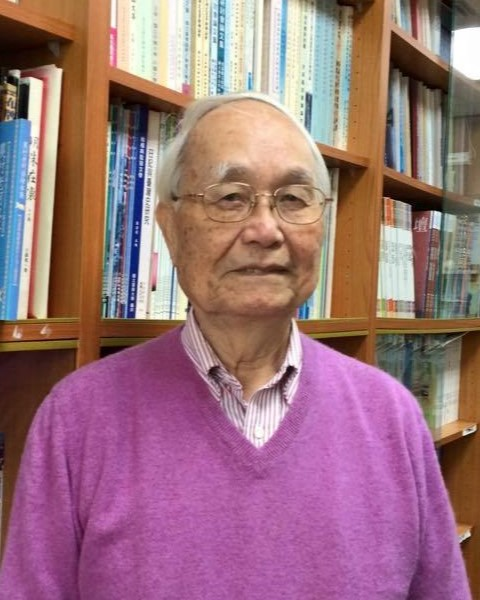
- Born: 1933; Minxiong, Chiayi County, Taiwan, Empire of Japan
- Died: September 3, 2025 (aged 91–92)
- Education: National Taiwan University (BA, MA); Princeton University (PhD)
- Occupations: Sinologist; writer
- Awards: National Award for Arts 1th Outstanding Translation; Emperor of Japan Order of the Rising Sun

Cheng Ching-mao (Chinese: 鄭清茂; 1933 – September 3, 2025) was a Taiwanese sinologist. He specialised in Chinese literature, Japanese literature, and Sino-Japanese literary relations. He was an associate professor of East Asian studies at University of California, Berkeley, the chair of Asian Languages and Literatures at University of Massachusetts, Amherst, and chair of Chinese Language and Literature at National Dong Hwa University.

== Life and career ==
Cheng received his B.A. and M.A. in Chinese literature from National Taiwan University, then earned his Ph.D. in East Asian studies from Princeton University. He served as an associate professor of East Asian Studies at University of California, Berkeley, and as Chair of Asian Languages and Literatures at University of Massachusetts, Amherst.

In 1996, after retiring from Boston, he returned to Taiwan and, along with Yang Mu, Wang Wenjin, and Yan Kunyang, co-founded Department of Chinese Language and Literature at NDHU College of Humanities and Social Sciences, as Founding Chair. After retiring from National Dong Hwa University in 2003, he received the 17th Outstanding Alumni Award from National Taiwan University. In 1997, Cheng Ching-mao was honored with the First National Literary Award for Outstanding Translation.

He authored books such as "Chinese Literature in Japan" and translated various works in Japanese sinology, including Kōjirō Yoshikawa's "Studies of Yuan Drama," "Introduction to Song Poetry," and "Introduction to Yuan and Ming Poetry," as well as Koichi Shonishi's "History of Japanese Literature," "The Tale of the Heike," and Matsuo Bashō's "The Narrow Road to the Interior." In 2015, he was honored with the "Order of the Rising Sun" of Emperor of Japan for his dedication to translating classic Japanese literature. In 2019, in order to nurture future generations of Japanese sinology researchers and literary translators, he donated his entire collection of over ten thousand books, historical materials, and manuscripts to National Dong Hwa University Library. In 2023, he received "Lifetime Achievement Award" at the 35th Liang Shih-chiu Literature Master Awards.

Cheng died on September 3, 2025, at the age of 92.
