= Ethnocide =

Extermination of ethnic identities

Ethnocide is the extermination or destruction of ethnic identities. Bartolomé Clavero differentiates ethnocide from genocide by stating that "Genocide kills people while ethnocide kills social cultures through the killing of individual souls". According to Martin Shaw, ethnocide is a core part of physically violent genocide. Some substitute cultural genocide for ethnocide, and other argue the distinction between ethnicity and culture. Cultural genocide and ethnocide have been used in different contexts. While the terms ethnocide and ethnic cleansing are similar, the intentions of their use vary. The term ethnic cleansing has been criticized as a euphemism that facilitates genocide denial by minimizing atrocities. In contrast, ethnocide acts as a critical tool of recognition, used by marginalized groups to assert that the destruction of their culture is a crime of genocidal proportions.

== Origin of the word ==
Raphael Lemkin, the lawyer who coined genocide in 1943 as the union of "the Greek word genos (race, tribe) and the Latin cide (killing)", also suggested ethnocide as an alternative form representing the same concept, using the Greek ethnos (nation) in place of genos. However, the term genocide has received much wider adoption than ethnocide.

== Usage ==
As early as 1933, the lawyer Raphael Lemkin proposed that genocide had a cultural component, a component which he called "cultural genocide." The term has since acquired rhetorical value as a phrase that is used to protest against the destruction of cultural heritage.

=== Proposed usage ===
The drafters of the 1948 Genocide Convention considered the use of the term, but dropped it from their consideration. The legal definition of genocide is left unspecific about the exact nature in which genocide is done, only stating that it is destruction with intent to destroy a racial, religious, ethnic or national group as such.

Article 7 of a 1994 draft of the United Nations Declaration on the Rights of Indigenous Peoples uses the word "ethnocide" as well as the phrase "cultural genocide" but it does not define what they mean. The complete article reads as follows:

Indigenous peoples have the collective and individual right not to be subjected to ethnocide and cultural genocide, including prevention of and redress for:

(a) Any action which has the aim or effect of depriving them of their integrity as distinct peoples, or of their cultural values or ethnic identities;
(b) Any action which has the aim or effect of dispossessing them of their lands, territories or resources;
(c) Any form of population transfer which has the aim or effect of violating or undermining any of their rights;
(d) Any form of assimilation or integration by other cultures or ways of life imposed on them by legislative, administrative or other measures;
(e) Any form of propaganda directed against them.

The United Nations Declaration on the Rights of Indigenous Peoples was adopted by the United Nations General Assembly during its 62nd session at UN Headquarters in New York City on 13 September 2007, but only mentions "genocide" in its Article 7, not "cultural genocide." Article 8 in the final document otherwise substantially retains the wording of the draft Article 7, but its first sentence reads "indigenous peoples and individuals have the right not to be subjected to forced assimilation or destruction of their culture".

== Notions of ethnocide ==
=== UNESCO ===
In UNESCO's "Declaration of San Jose":

The Declaration of San Jose commits the United States and the nations of Central America to engage in a more in-depth discussion about a broad range of issues. These issues include: strengthening democracy and regional security, building trade and investment, combating crime, drugs and corruption, promoting dialogue on immigration, and achieving more equitable and sustainable development. In the Declaration of San José, UNESCO also addresses and works to define ethnocide. UNESCO defines the term as follows:

Ethnocide means that an ethnic group is denied the right to enjoy, develop and transmit its own culture and its own language, whether collectively or individually. This involves an extreme form of massive violation of human rights and, in particular, the right of ethnic groups to respect for their cultural identity.

=== Robert Jaulin ===
The French ethnologist Robert Jaulin (1928-1996) proposed a redefinition of the concept of ethnocide in 1970, to refer not the means but the ends that define ethnocide. Accordingly, the ethnocide would be the systematic destruction of the thought and the way of life of people different from those who carry out this enterprise of destruction. Whereas the genocide assassinates the people in their body, the ethnocide kills them in their spirit.

=== Pierre Clastres ===
In Chapter 4 of The Archeology of Violence by Pierre Clastres

Ethnocide, unlike genocide, is not based on the destruction of the physical person, but rather on the destruction of a person's culture. Ethnocide exterminates ways of thinking, living, and being from various cultures. It aims to destroy cultural differences, especially focused on the idea of "wrong" differences, that are present in a minority group by transforming the group's population into the culture norm of a certain place. This measuring of differences according to one's own culture is called ethnocentrism. The ethnocentric mind is based on the assumption that there is a hierarchy of superior and inferior cultures. Therefore, ethnocide hopes to raise inferior cultures to the status of superior cultures by any means necessary.

=== Barry Sautman ===
Barry Victor Sautman is a professor with the Division of Social Science at the Hong Kong University of Science and Technology.

The "intent that underlies ethnocide is not the same intent as the intent of cultural genocide, for the same reason that it is not tied to physical or biological destruction of a group. The intent is therefore typically aimed at forced assimilation and not on population decimation. Thus the intent that underlies ethnocide is an intentional act resulting in cultural death"

== Contemporary examples ==
The destruction by Azerbaijan of thousands of medieval Armenian Churches, khachkars and gravestones in Nakhchivan and elsewhere – and Azerbaijan's denial that these sites have ever existed – has been cited as an example of cultural genocide or ethnocide.

== See also ==
- Cultural genocide
- Ethnodevelopment
- Forced assimilation
- Language death
- Linguistic discrimination (includes Linguicide)
- Policide
- Gaza genocide
- Rwandan genocide
