= Ethnodevelopment =

Ethnodevelopment is the means of countering ethnocide by enabling ethnic, minority, and/or exploited groups to revive values of their specific culture with a focus on strengthening their ability to resist exploitation and oppression and especially, their independent decision-making power through more effective control of the political, economic, social, and cultural processes affecting their development. Ethnodevelopment is a policy established in response to ethnocide, where indigenous cultures and ways of life are being lost due to large-scale development and exploitation in certain developing countries around the world. This large-scale development could include urban development in rural communities and exploitation of natural resources including building dams, mines, or clear-cutting forests. Typically self-led ethnodevelopment is favoured, where the indigenous peoples are involved in creating a plan for their future development and organization of communities in a way that follows their tradition beliefs and customs.

== History ==
Outside intervention on indigenous minorities can have devastating effects. The effects include the growth of the more dominant society and encroachment on the traditional lands and subsequent displacement of peoples from resource rich land to the peripheries; the destruction of normal means of livelihood and interactions with habitat; an increase in trade debts and a decline in self-governance due to new political, legal and educational systems and the deterioration of traditional religious and cultural values. The most common responses to the effects have been to retreat or assimilate, which can lead to extreme poverty, welfare requirements, social dislocation, alcoholism, and prostitution. Ethnodevelopment is proposed to end the increasing vulnerability of minority groups and produce a degree of economic, social, and political equality. One of the first steps in overcoming these trends is to reverse the notions about dominant Western developmental models and recognize the variability in traditional cultures, practices and values these populations have. The emergence of Neoliberalism in developing countries instigated a reduction of subsidies, and fiscal cutbacks that most indigenous and rural livelihoods were based on. In many Latin American countries with large populations of indigenous peoples such as Ecuador, Bolivia, Mexico, and Guatemala, the elimination of rural development programs in the 1980s and 1990s provided an incentive for indigenous outcry and protestations. Neoliberal policies of open markets in land, water, and non-traditional exports had extensive impacts on rural livelihood, especially the already impoverished and landless groups. While the idea of ethnodevelopment pre-dates the influence of Neoliberal development policies, it was only used in small sets of indigenous activists and NGO groups, but dissatisfaction over the social impacts due to new governmental policies on their traditional lifestyles brought such approaches to the forefront. This movement has been central in using ethnodevelopment policy to focus on bringing indigenous populations out of poverty. Indigenous responses to Neoliberal measures have been to propose alternate law proposals, nationwide protests, and new forms of organization including transnational coalitions that join multiple indigenous groups that are fighting for the same issues. Included in their ideas of development are culturally appropriate education that recognizes their own values and knowledge but also strengthens political structures, organizations and leadership.

== Outcomes ==
With the increase in pressure from indigenous groups for more rights and provisions for their cultural independence causing global recognition of these issues. The World Bank, Inter-American Development Bank, and the European Union revised their policies to lessen their developmental damage to indigenous groups. The World Bank has also consulted with government officials and ethnic group representatives worldwide, particularly Latin America, Asia, and Africa on new developmental frameworks for tribal and indigenous people. The Betau Project introduced in Malaysia in regards to the improvement in conditions of the Orang Asli groups that traditionally occupy the jungles in small communities, was introduced to provide jungle security and integration of Orang Asli into Malaysian society. It is predicted that the 7,539 acre settlement with its own economic base, yet still linked to Malaysian settlements, will encourage a sense of community with communal farming and communal ownership. Villages that are relocated shall retain their own identity and leaders while families will gain 8.5 acres of their own land. Although the project seems to make allowances for traditional beliefs and customs there are still structural issues due to a hierarchical regional market which could resign Semai people to the bottom or cause increasing dependence on government for welfare and support. In addition, the idea that voluntary resettlement can occur is not quite true in that the constant threat of displacement and reduction of their natural territory would force Semoi people to cooperate with this project due to the loss of their original land.

== Ethnodevelopment in Andean Peru ==
An example of ethnodevelopment in action is the case study worked on by Hogue and Rau (2008). They studied the district of Combapata, Peru which is located in the southern Andes. It ranges in altitudes and is vertically stratified into three distinct tiers based on the plant species found there that have agricultural potential. The citizens of the thirteen communities found in this area rely on agriculture, animal husbandry, and herding for their livelihood. This livelihood also depends on the Salcca River which provides the water necessary for the production of cattle, hay, grains, and vegetables and is one of the only clean water resources in the region. The current of the Salcca River is also viewed as an energy source due to its large volume of water and high altitudes. The Peruvian government proposed to build a dam in order to harness hydroelectric power from the river, which would mean the loss of agricultural and pasture land, and the displacement of communities that relied on those resources. The indigenous peoples of the Salcca River Valley rejected this idea as it would drastically change their way of life not only economically but spiritually as well. The Andean belief is that all sources of nature are living beings and are sources of health and spiritual well-being. The land and river are used in traditional ceremonies and festivals and are intrinsic to their daily life economically, socially, and spiritually. This initiated the beginnings of resistance by the indigenous peoples by use of their ethnic identity to protect their way of life and ensure that development occurs in a way that coincides with their beliefs. They wish to "develop" in a way that still respects their local concepts of morality and their relationships with nature and with each other. The indigenous populations of the Salcca River Valley were then forced to distinguish what they wanted for their communities and how they plan on achieving it. They were not opposed to development as to them "development" was an increase in their capital, improvements in education, social order, and organization. They wanted improvements that would not harm their social interactions or cultural forms. This has caused the community to push for organization, and has generated a goal for self-led ethnodevelopment and compelled them to unify and develop their own ideological framework which protects their environment and their culture.

== Research Institute ==
In Taiwan, National Dong Hwa University (NDHU) established College of Indigenous Studies, home to Asia’s first academic program dedicated to ethnodevelopment studies. This program was offered by Graduate Institute of Ethnodevelopment, designed to train students in culturally sensitive and sustainable development practices. The institute plays a critical role in researching and advancing policies that support indigenous empowerment and in preserving global indigenous cultural heritage.
