= Pegatron =

Taiwanese contract manufacturer

Pegatron Corporation
- Native name: 和碩聯合科技股份有限公司
- Type: Public
- Traded as: TWSE: 4938
- Industry: Electronics manufacturing
- Founded: June 27, 2007; 19 years ago
- Headquarters: Beitou District, Taipei, Taiwan
- Area served: Worldwide
- Key people: T.H. Tung (Chairman)
- Products: Motherboards, graphics cards, laptops, netbooks, smartphones, game consoles, set-top boxes, cable modems
- Revenue: ▼NT$1.12 trillion (2025) (US$35.85 billion)
- Operating income: ▼NT$14.85 billion (2025) (US$476.47 million)
- Net income: ▼NT$15.71 billion (2025) (US$504.06 million)
- Total assets: ▼NT$584.26 billion (2025) (US$18.75 billion)
- Total equity: ▲NT$181.42 billion (2025) (US$5.82 billion)
- Number of employees: 48507
- Subsidiaries: ASRock; Unihan Corporation
- Website: www.pegatroncorp.com

PEGATRON Corporation
- Traditional Chinese: 和碩聯合科技股份有限公司
- Simplified Chinese: 和硕联合科技股份有限公司
Transcriptions
Standard Mandarin
- Hanyu Pinyin: Héshuò Liánhé Kējì Gǔfèn Yǒuxiàn Gōngsī

Pegatron Corporation (stylized as PEGΛTRON) is a Taiwanese electronics manufacturer specializing in developing and producing computing, communications, and consumer electronics for major brands. The company also designs and manufactures computer peripherals and components. Pegatron's primary products include laptops, desktop computers, netbooks, game consoles, handheld and mobile devices, motherboards, video cards, and LCD TVs. The company also produces broadband communication devices such as smartphones, set-top boxes and cable modems.

== History ==
In January 2008, Asus restructured its operations, creating three independent companies: Asus (for branded computers and electronics), Pegatron (OEM manufacturing of motherboards and components), and Unihan Corporation (non-PC manufacturing, such as cases and molding). During this process, a controversial pension restructuring plan resulted in the payout—rather than continuation—of existing employee contributions. Pegatron was officially spun off from Asus on June 1, 2010.

In recent years, Pegatron has become a key supplier of components for Tesla. During the second wave of the COVID-19 pandemic in India, Pegatron temporarily halted production after employees tested positive. Subsequently, Pegatron's India plant assumed some Apple iPhones production due to pandemic-related disruptions at its Shenzhen facility. In January 2025, Tata Group purchased a 60% stake in Pegatron's India unit.

On 11 March 2026, Pegatron warned that said prolonged disruptions to regional oil supplies or key materials due to the ongoing Middle East conflict could pose risks to the technology supply chain in the future.

== Corporate profile ==
=== Operations ===
Pegatron's principal executive offices and many assets are located in Taiwan. As of March 2010, Pegatron had approximately 5,646 employees stationed in Taiwan, 89,521 in China, 2,400 in the Czech Republic, and 200 in the United States, Mexico, and Japan. Pegatron has manufacturing plants in Taiwan, the Czech Republic, Mexico, Indonesia, and China, and customer service centers in the United States and Japan.

=== Subsidiaries ===
==== Unihan Corporation ====
As part of the corporate restructuring of Asus in 2007, Pegatron acquired Unihan Corporation from Asus in January 2008. Since 2008, the Unihan Corporation has been a subsidiary of Pegatron Corporation that designs and manufactures computers, computer peripherals and audio-video products.

=== Corporate social responsibility ===
In June 2008, Pegatron launched its PUreCSR corporate responsibility system and became a member of the Electronic Industry Citizenship Coalition (EICC). The EICC promotes the implementation of a Code of Conduct in the electronics and ICT supply chain, aiming to ensure safe working conditions, uphold employee dignity, and support environmentally responsible manufacturing. Pegatron's corporate responsibility system, PUreCSR (which stands for Pegatron & Unihan reduce, reuse, recycle, recovery, replace & repair Corporate Social Responsibility), meets the international standards: the ISO 14001 Environmental Management System, the OHSAS 18001 Occupational Health & Safety Management System, and the QC 080000 Hazardous Substance Process Management System. On 18 May 2010, the board of directors at Pegatron unanimously approved to appropriate a sum within 0.5% of net income every year to charity.

=== PEGA Design and Engineering (PEGA D&E) ===
PEGA Design and Engineering is Pegatron's design team that was originally branched off from the Asus design team. The PEGA D&E helps Pegatron's clients with product development, including market research, conceptualization, product design, materials study, and production.
In addition to 3C (computer, communication, consumer) electronic products, Pegatron designs home appliances and home decor products such as LCD TVs, LED lighting, phones and more.

=== PEGA CASA (Pegatron MID - ID design team) ===
Led by Alain Lee, the PEGA CASA design team (originally branched off from the Asus design team) is dedicated to the design and development of non-IT products in addition to the existing IT product design, including notebooks, smartphones, e-books, network communication equipment, displays, projectors, cleaning robots and more. These non-IT products include home appliances (PEGA CASA), fashion accessories, vehicle accessories (PEGA MOTORS), building interior design and building materials, multimedia ads and marketing, and cultural businesses.

== Controversies ==
=== Working conditions ===
In December 2014, the BBC accused Pegatron of poor working conditions and employee mistreatment at its factories making Apple products near Shanghai. It found that staff were being forced to work eighteen days in a row without any days off, workers falling asleep on the production line during shifts lasting between 12 and 16 hours, forced overtime, and a cramped dormitory room which twelve workers were forced to share.

In August 2016, the labor rights organization "China Labor Watch" published a report claiming that working conditions had not improved since 2014. They claimed that workers at Pegatron's Shanghai factory worked an average of 80 hours of overtime a month, and that over 62% of workers worked more than 100 overtime hours in March 2016. They also claimed that workers were required to perform up to 1 hour a day of unpaid overwork, that 64% of its maintenance department interns were overworked, and that over 96% of Pegatron workers were only making minimum wage, well below Shanghai's average income despite the extra overtime hours they put in.

In November 2020, the Wall Street Journal accused Apple of using student workers in Pegatron's factories. Due to this, Apple suspended their business with Pegatron and stated that they would not grant the company any new business until this practice was ceased.

In December 2020, Pegatron's Shanghai subsidiary Pegaer Technology (Shanghai) Co., Ltd.「昌碩科技」experienced labor disputes, with thousands gathering to demand salaries. Reports alleged that the factory director and police responded with force, resulting in injuries and several arrests. However, the cited source does not substantiate all of these claims.

== See also ==
- List of companies of Taiwan
- Asus
- ASRock
