= Tzu-Hsien Tung =

Taiwanese businessman

- 童子賢
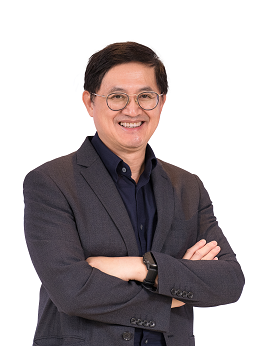
- Born: 25 June 1960 (age 65); Ruisui, Hualien County, Taiwan
- Education: National Taipei University of Technology (BS, MS)
- Occupation: Businessman
- Honours: National Dong Hwa University (Honoris Causa)

Tzu-Hsien Tung (Chinese: 童子賢; pinyin: Tóng Zǐxián; born 25 June 1960) is a Taiwanese businessman and philanthropist. He is a co-founder and former vice chairman of Asus. Currently, he serves as the chairman of Pegatron. Tung received an honorary Doctor of Science degree from National Dong Hwa University in 2015 and funded the establishment of the Yang Mu Center for Literary Studies at NDHU College of Humanities and Social Sciences.

== Early life and education ==
Tzu-Hsien Tung was born in 1960 in Ruisui, Hualien County, Taiwan. His father was a watchmaker. He grew up in the countryside and played Little League Baseball. As a child, he was influenced by the works of Yang Mu and Hu Shih.

After high school, Tung earned a B.S. in electrical engineering from the National Taipei University of Technology in 1980 and earned a master's degree in computer and communication engineering from the university in 2000. In college, he regularly skipped class to read independently instead, often reading censored books. He was also the editor-in-chief of the campus newspaper.

== Career ==
Tung started his career at Acer Inc. T.H. Tung co-founded Asus in 1989. He served as its vice chairman. He became the majority shareholder of Eslite Bookstore.

Tung serves as the chairman of Pegatron. Additionally, he serves as the chairman of Kinsus and Lumens.

== Philanthropy ==
According to CommonWealth Magazine, "He has sponsored countless artistic and cultural events and financed historical research on late presidents Chiang Kai-shek and Chiang Ching-kuo and documentaries on the careers of Taiwanese writers."
