= NDHU College of Humanities and Social Sciences =

School of Humanities and Social Sciences of National Dong Hwa University (NDHU)

- 國立東華大學人文社會科學學院
- Seal of NDHU College of Humanities and Social Sciences
- Type: National (Public); Humanities; Social science
- Established: August 1, 1995
- Founder: Yang Mu (楊牧)
- Parent institution: National Dong Hwa University
- Dean: Awi • Mona, PhD
- Director: Hsu, Jen-Yi (Associate Dean); Chu, Chin-Peng (European Union Research Centre Director); Hsu, Yu-Fang (Yang Mu Center for Literary Studies Director); Chu, Chia-Wen (International Research Center of the Dream of the Red Chamber Director)
- Faculty: 105 (Fall 2024)
- Students: 2,456 (Spring 2023)
- Undergraduates: 1,946 (Spring 2023)
- Postgraduates: 510 (Spring 2023)
- Doctoral students: 73 (Spring 2023)
- Location: Shoufeng, Hualien, Taiwan
- Campus: Shoufeng Campus
- Website: CHASS.NDHU.edu.tw

Chinese name
- Traditional Chinese: 國立東華大學人文社會科學學院
- Simplified Chinese: 国立东华大学人文社会科学学院
Transcriptions
Standard Mandarin
- Hanyu Pinyin: Guólì Dōnghuá Dàxué Rénwén Shèhuì Kēxué Xuéyuàn
- Bopomofo: ㄍㄨㄛˊ ㄌㄧˋ ㄉㄨㄥ ㄏㄨㄚˊ ㄉㄚˋ ㄒㄩㄝˊ ㄖㄣˊ ㄨㄣˊ ㄕㄜˋ ㄏㄨㄟˋ ㄎㄜ ㄒㄩㄝˊ ㄒㄩㄝˊ ㄩㄢˋ
Southern Min
- Tâi-lô: Kok-li̍p Tong-huâ Tāi-ha̍k Lîn-bûn Siā-huē Kho-ha̍k Ha̍k-īnn

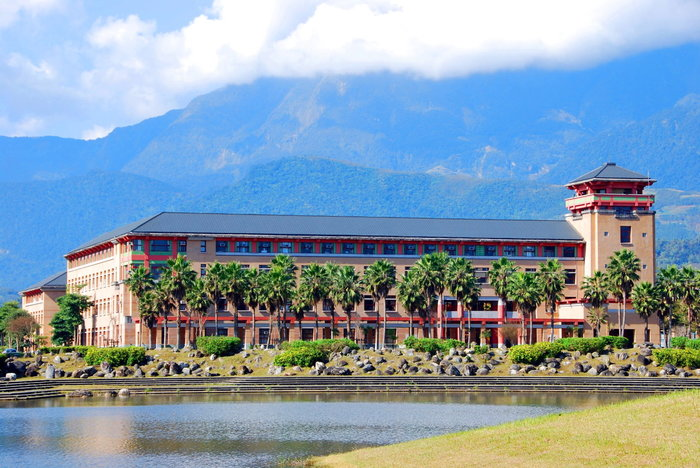
A view of NDHU College of Humanities and Social Sciences

NDHU College of Humanities and Social Sciences (NDHU CHASS; Chinese: 國立東華大學人文社會科學學院; pinyin: Dōnghuá Rénwén Shèhuì Kēxué Xuéyuàn) is an interdisciplinary school of Humanities and Social Sciences of National Dong Hwa University (NDHU). Founded in 1995, with Professor Yang Mu, the Founding Dean of HKUST School of Humanities and Social Science and Founding Director of Institute of Chinese Literature and Philosophy at Academia Sinica, as Founding Dean.

NDHU CHASS is one of the founding institutions of National Dong Hwa University as well as Taiwan's first school for interdisciplinary studies of Humanities and Social Sciences, which its MFA program in Creative Writing is recognized the first and most premier program for creative writing in Chinese-speaking world.

== History ==
=== Foundation ===
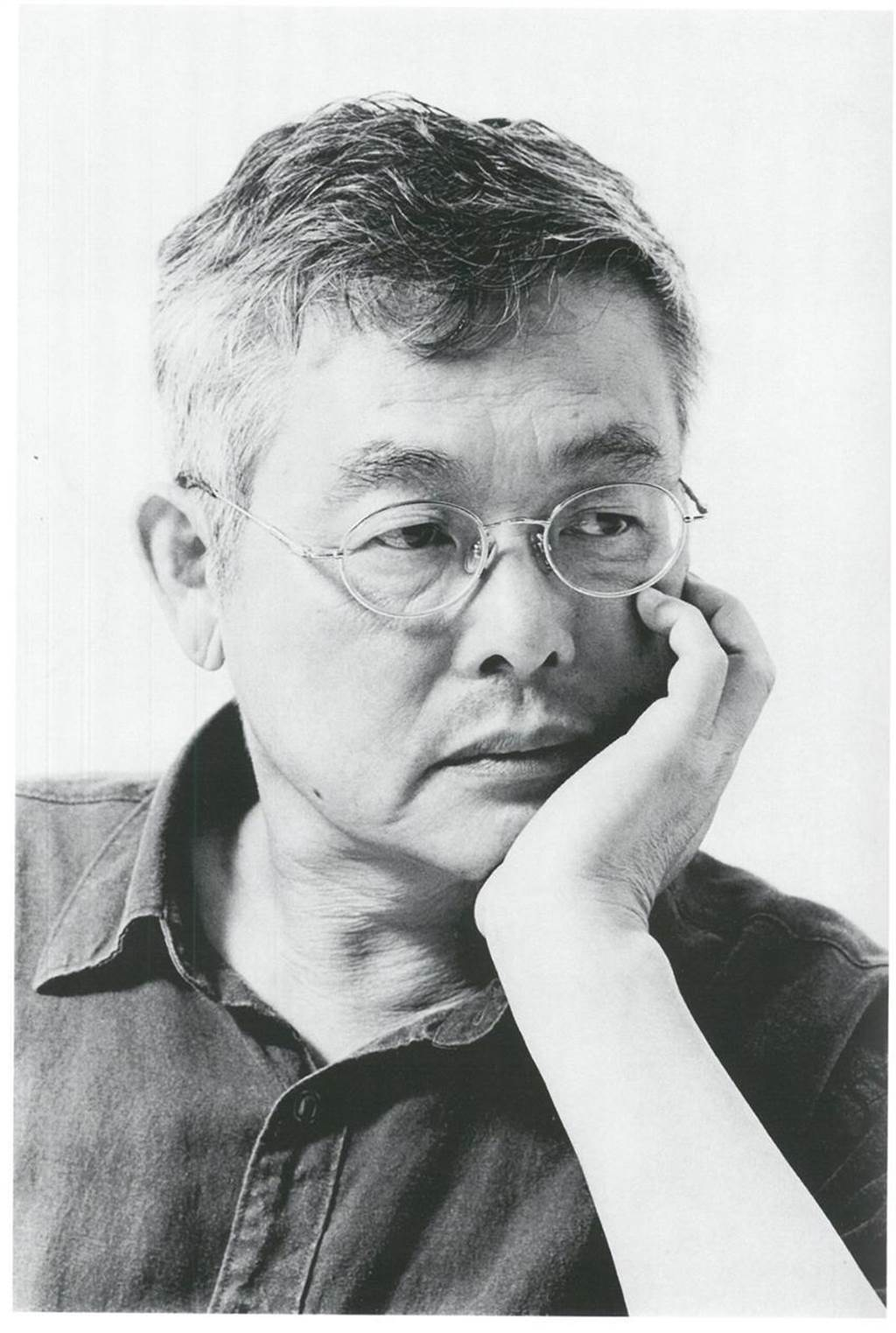
Yang Mu

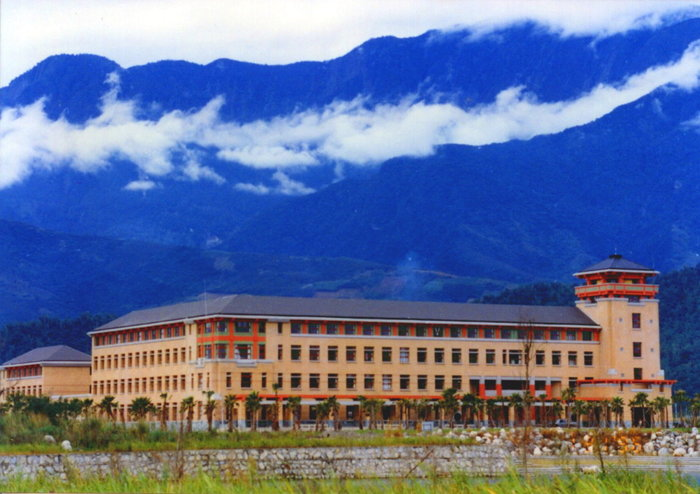
NDHU College of Humanities and Social Sciences Building I in 1994

With Yang Mu returned from Hong Kong and United States, NDHU College of Humanities and Social Sciences (NDHU CHASS) was founded in 1995 as Taiwan's first institution for Humanities and Social Sciences to serve the interdisciplinary trend of both disciplines. As Yang Mu's latest founded institution, he brought his academic experiences and network from being the Dean of HKUST School of Humanities and Social Science, Director of Institute of Chinese Literature and Philosophy at Academia Sinica, and Professor of Comparative Literature at University of Washington, to NDHU CHASS.

In 1995, NDHU CHASS was established with 3 graduate institutes - Graduate Institute of China Studies, Graduate Institute of International Economics, and Graduate Institute of Education, which were founded by many oversea Taiwanese scholars, including Cheng Chih-Ming, Professor of Economics at Georgia Institute of Technology, Hsieh Ting-Chung, Chair of Economics at California State Polytechnic University, Pomona, Tuan Chyau, Professor of Decision Sciences and Managerial Economics at Chinese University of Hong Kong, Liu Yue-Yun, Chair of Political Science at Brandon University, and Wen Yin-Kenn, the Senior Economist at World Bank. Meanwhile, NDHU CHASS established Graduate Institute of Ethnic Relations and Cultures with Chiao Chien, Founding Chair of Anthropology at Chinese University of Hong Kong, as founding director, which was Taiwan's first for Ethnic Relations and Cultural Anthropology.

In 1996, NDHU CHASS established Department of Chinese Language and Literature and Department of English with Cheng Ching-mao, Chair of East Asian Languages and Cultures at University of Massachusetts Amherst, and Wu Chuan-Cheng, Chair of Foreign Languages and Literatures at National Taiwan University, as founding chair. In 1997, Graduate Institute of International Economics expanded its academics to establish Department of Economics. In 1998, NDHU CHASS established Department of Sport and Leisure Studies with Wang Philip, Professor of Recreation & Tourism Management at Kent State University, as founding chair, which was Taiwan's first for Leisure studies and Kinesiology. Meanwhile, it established Postgraduate Certificate program of Public Administration, which was first in Eastern Taiwan.

In 1999, NDHU CHASS established Department of History, with Chang Li, Research Fellow at Institute of Modern History at Academia Sinica, as founding chair, which was Taiwan's first academic institution for Public History. In 2000, NDHU CHASS established Graduate Institute of Creative Writing and English Literature, which offered Chinese-speaking world's first MFA program in Creative Writing. Meanwhile, it established Center for Asia-Pacific Regional Studies, PhD program in Chinese Language and Literature, and Executive Master program of School Administration. In 2001, With the founding of NDHU College of Indigenous Studies, NDHU CHASS's Graduate Institute of Ethnic Relations and Cultures was moved to it to provide integrative training in Indigenous Studies. Following the maturity of China Studies in Taiwan, the Graduate Institute of China Studies was divided into 2 institutes - Graduate Institute of Public Administration and Graduate Institute of Financial and Economic Law. Meanwhile, the Department of Counseling and Guidance were established with Yee Der-Huey, the Master of Psychology in Chinese-speaking world, as founding chair. In 2004, the Department of Counseling and Guidance was renamed as Department of Clinical and Counseling Psychology to serve interdiscipline training in Counseling Psychology and Clinical Psychology.

=== Nowaday ===
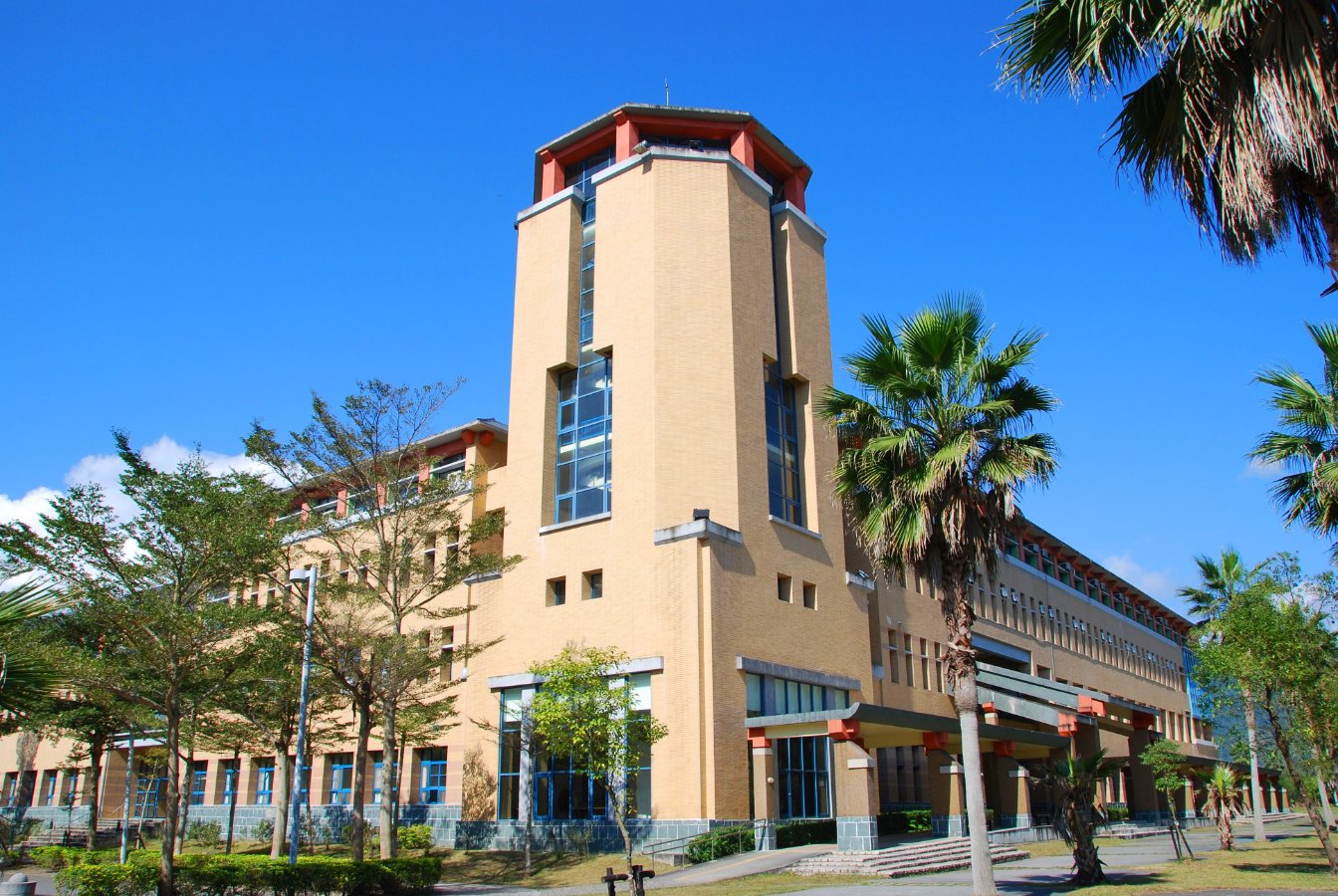
NDHU College of Humanities and Social Sciences Building II

With the merger of National Dong Hwa University and National Hualien University of Education, NDHU CHASS's Graduate Institute of Education was moved to the newly established Hua-Shih College of Education, and established Department of Sinophone Literatures, Department of Taiwan and Regional Studies, Department of Social and Public Affairs, which developed Taiwan's first Sinophone Studies, Taiwan Studies, Asia–Pacific Studies. In 2013, the Undergraduate program of Law was established, and Department of Social and Public Administration was divided into Department of Sociology and Department of Public Administration. In 2017, NDHU CHASS established Dual Degree program with Graduate School of Humanities and Social Sciences of Hiroshima University. In 2019, NDHU CHASS partnered with Chinese Language Center to jointly established International PhD program in Teaching Chinese as a Second Language. In 2020, NDHU CHASS established International Ph.D. Program in Asia-Pacific Regional Studies.

== Academic ==
- National Dong Hwa University; College of Humanities and Social Sciences Rankings

Global Ranking
QS Social Sciences and Management‌	501-550 (2025)
QS Art and Design	201-260 (2025)
SCImage Gender Studies	197 (2026)

National Ranking
QS Social Sciences and Management‌	9 (2025)
QS Art and Design	4 (2025)
SCImage Gender Studies	1 (2026)

In 2025, QS World University Ranking ranked NDHU CHASS 4th in Taiwan (59th in Asia) for Arts & Design for Art & Design and 9th in Taiwan (147th in Asia) for Social Sciences & Management, making NDHU CHASS the only Taiwanese university under 45 years old featured in these rankings. In 2026, SCImago Journal and Institutions Rank ranked NDHU CHASS 1st in Taiwan (14th in Asia) for Gender Studies, making the school the only Taiwanese university featured in this ranking.

=== Academic organizations ===
==== Departments ====
- Department of Chinese Language and Literature (CLL)
- Department of Sinophone Literatures and Creative Writing (SLCW)
- Department of English (ENG)
- Department of History (HIST)
- Department of Public Administration (PA)
- Department of Economics (ECON)
- Department of Sociology (SOC)
- Department of Counseling and Clinical Psychology (CCP)
- Department of Law (LAW)
- Department of Taiwan and Regional Studies (TRS)

==== Research centers ====
- European Union Research Centre (EURC)
- Humanities Innovation and Social Practice Research Center (HISPRC)
- Yang Mu Center for Literary Studies (YMCLS)
- International Research Center of the Dream of the Red Chamber (RDRC)
- Research Center of Public History

=== Publications ===
- Dong Hwa Journal of Chinese Studies (東華漢學) (THCI Core) ISSN 1726-8265
- Dong Hwa Humanistic Studies (東華人文學報) (THCI Core) ISSN 1608-8344
- Sinophone Literatures and Culture (華文文學與文化) ISSN 2225-4536
- NDHU Students' Journal of Historical Review (洄瀾春秋) ISSN 1812-6502

== Academic programs ==
=== Graduate ===
==== Doctor of Philosophy (PhD) ====
The Doctoral program (PhD) at NDHU College of Humanities and Social Sciences is a full-time, in-residence program intended for students who plan scholarly careers involving research and teaching in Humanities and Social Sciences. There are five PhD programs:

- PhD in Asia-Pacific Regional Studies (International)
- PhD in Economics
- PhD in Chinese Literature and Language
- PhD in Folk Literature
- PhD in Teaching Chinese as a Second Language (International)

==== Master of Arts (MA) ====
Master of Arts (MA) has nineteen major tracks for MA students follow at NDHU College of Humanities and Social Sciences:

- MA in Chinese Language and Literature
- MA in Folk Literature
- MA in Literary and Cultural Studies
- MA in Teaching Chinese and Calligraphy (International)
- MA in Teaching English to Speakers of Other Languages (TESOL)
- MA in History
- MA in Taiwan Studies
- MA in Asia-Pacific Regional Studies (International)
- MA in Economics (International)
- MA in Sociology
- MA in Social Enterprise

==== Master of Science (MSc) ====
- MSc in Counseling Psychology
- MSc in Clinical Psychology
- MSc in Psychological Sciences

==== Master of Fine Arts (MFA) ====
NDHU CHASS's Master of Fine Arts (MFA) in Creative Writing is Chinese-speaking world's first MFA program, which MFA students can submit creative writing works as thesis. Qualified student will receive this degree after passing final defense of its artworks.

==== Master of Public Administration (MPA) ====
NDHU CHASS's Master of Public Administration (MPA) aims to equip students with the core analytical skills, practical tools and professional experience to serve in executive positions in national, municipal, state, and federal government and nongovernmental organizations (NGOs).

==== Master of Laws (LLM) ====
NDHU CHASS's Master of Laws (LLM) is a professional degree in Laws, which provides interdisciplinary training in social, environmental, technological, economic, financial, Indigenous issues for students with or without a legal background.

=== Undergraduate ===
NDHU College of Humanities and Social Sciences offers 10 programs in different majors.

- Bachelor of Arts (BA) in Chinese Language and Literature
- Bachelor of Arts (BA) in Sinophone Literatures
- Bachelor of Arts (BA) in English
- Bachelor of Arts (BA) in History
- Bachelor of Arts (BA) in Taiwan and Regional Studies
- Bachelor of Arts (BA) in Economics
- Bachelor of Arts (BA) in Sociology
- Bachelor of Arts (BA) in Public Administration
- Bachelor of Science (BS) in Counseling and Clinical Psychology
- Bachelor of Law (LLB) in Law

These programs operate on a modular system where students design their curricula to pace their studies. They may also take modules of their interest, subject to any prerequisite requirements and to the availability of modules.

=== Dual Degree ===
==== NDHU–Essex ====
NDHU College of Humanities and Social Sciences offers 4-year Bachelor-Master in partnership with University of Essex in United Kingdom. The partnership includes Department of Sociology and Criminology, Department of Government, Department of Economics, Essex Business School, School of Philosophical Historical and Interdisciplinary Studies, Department of Language and Linguistics, and Department of Literature, Film, and Theatre Studies.

==== NDHU–Hiroshima ====
NDHU CHASS offers 2-year Dual-MA in partnership with Hiroshima University Graduate School of Humanities and Social Sciences in Japan. The partnership includes School of Law (Law, Political Science, and Sociology) and School of Economics (Economic Theory and Econometrics, Historical Economic Science, Economic Policy, Applied Economics, and Business Management and Data Processing).

==== NDHU–CU Denver ====
NDHU CHASS offers 4-year BA-MA/MS in partnership with University of Colorado Denver Department of Economics in United States. The partnership includes M.A. in Economics and M.S. in Health Economics.

== Global Partnership ==
NDHU established academic partnership and exchange program with many universities, including Peking University School of Government, Yonsei University College of Liberal Arts and Institute for Sinology, Sungkyunkwan University College of Liberal Arts, Beijing Normal University School of Sociology and School of Chinese Language and Literature, Tianjin University School of Liberal Arts and Law, Sichuan University College of Literature and Journalism, Shandong University School of Economics, Nankai University School of Economics and Faculty of History, Hiroshima University Graduate School of Humanities and Social Sciences, Free University of Berlin Jean Monnet Centre of Excellence, University of Mannheim School of Humanities, University of Hamburg Faculty of Law, University of Warsaw Faculty of Political Science and International Studies in Poland.

== People ==
Notable present and past NDHU faculty include:

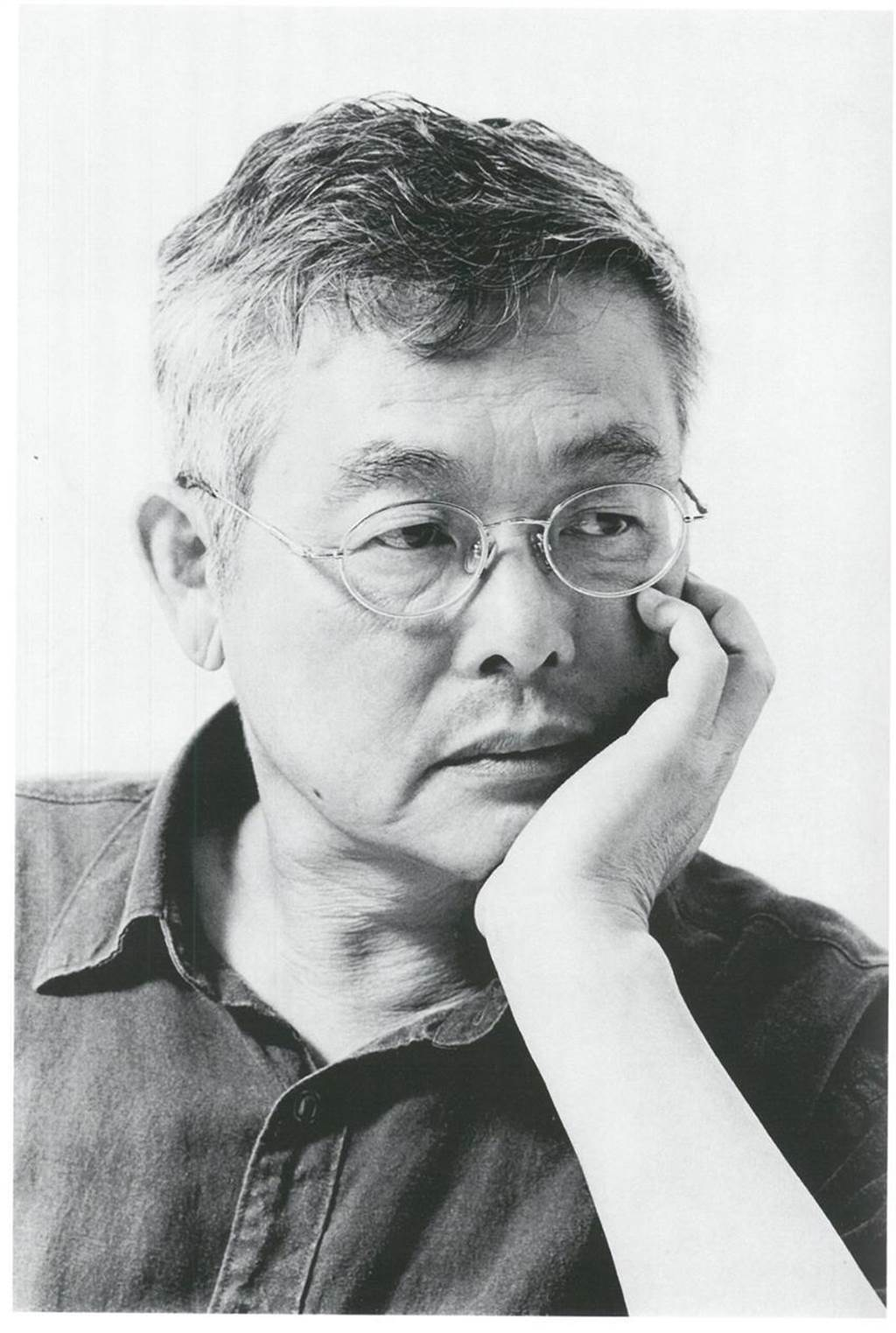
Laureate of Newman Prize for Chinese Literature (2013) and Cikada Prize (2016) Yang Mu

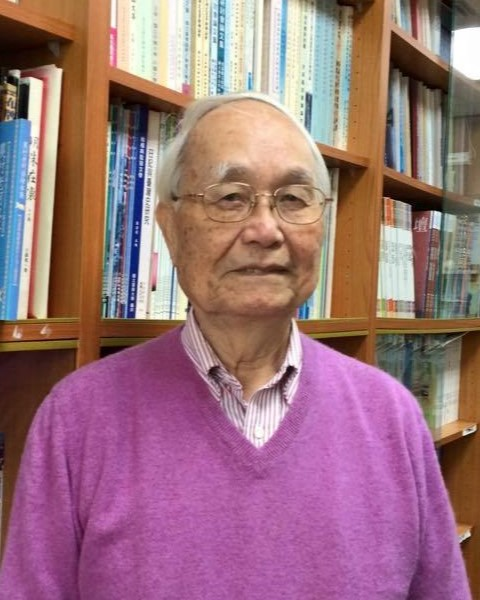
Laureate of Japanese Order of the Rising Sun (2014) Cheng Ching-mao

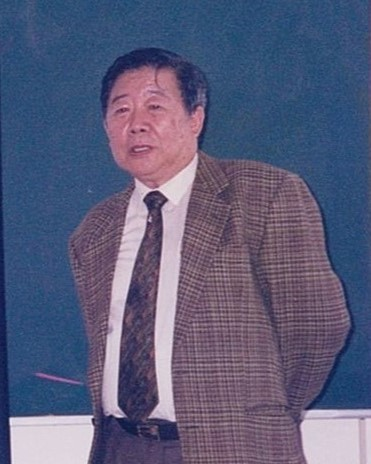
Laureate of China's Lifetime Achievement Award in Anthropology (2015) Chiao Chien

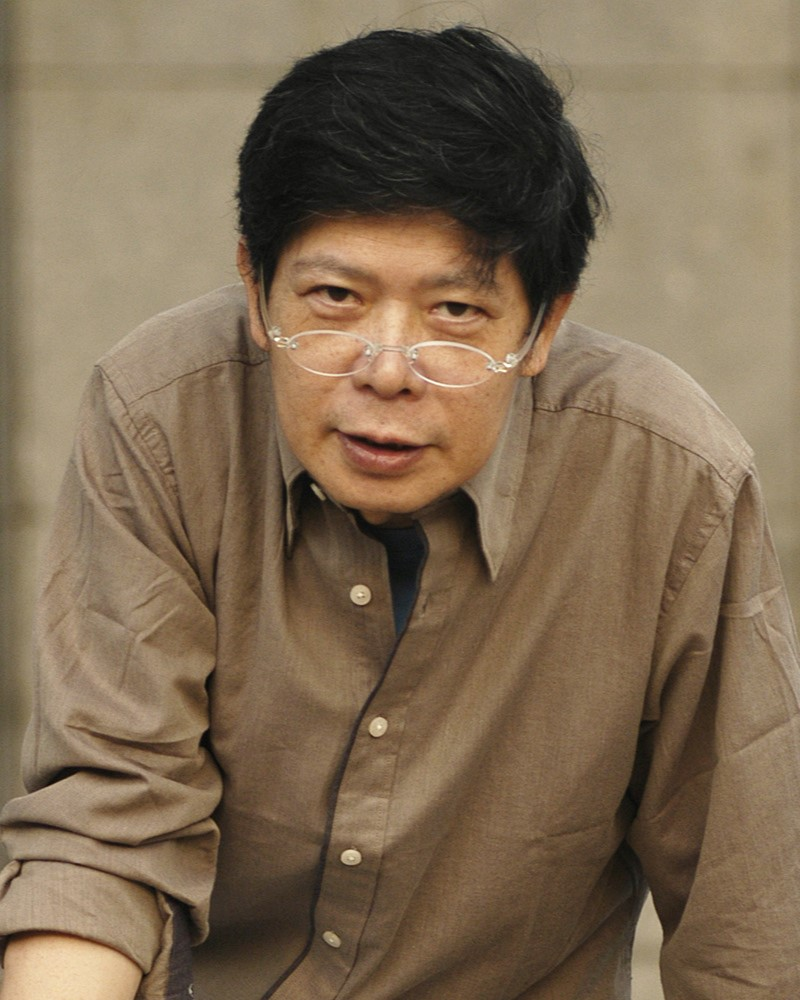
The Master of Chinese Indigenous Psychology Yee Der-Huey

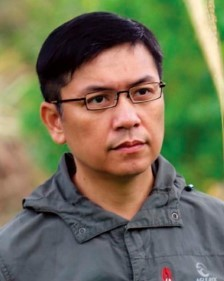
The first Taiwanese nominee of Man Booker International Prize (2018) Wu Ming-yi

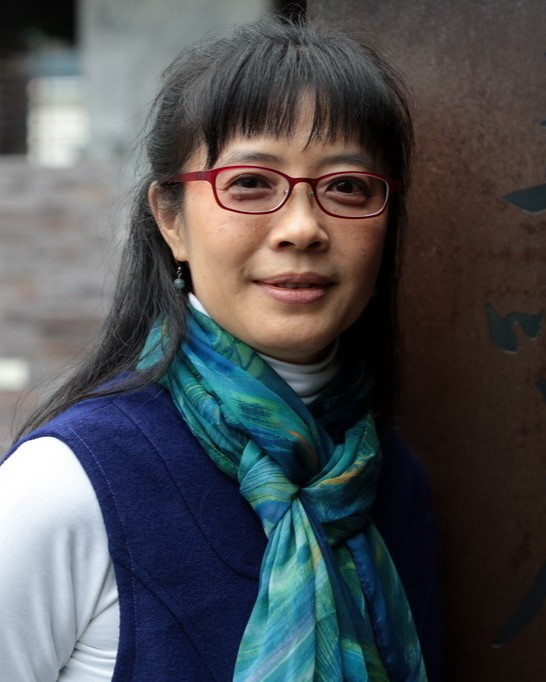
Founder of 5wayhouse Social Enterprise ku June

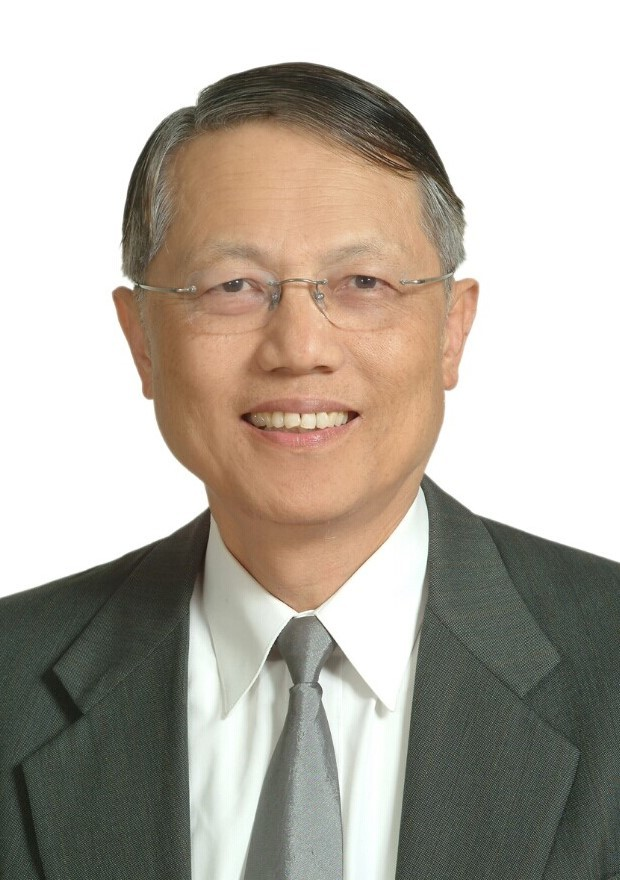
Director of Board of Directors of Central Bank of the Republic of China (Taiwan) Yin-kann Wen

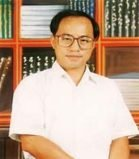
Director of Board of Directors of Central Bank of the Republic of China (Taiwan) Jin-Lung Lin

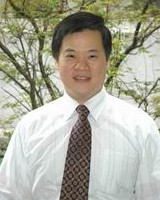
Chairman of Taiwan Institute of Economic Research and Chung-Hua Institution for Economic Research Chung-Shu Wu

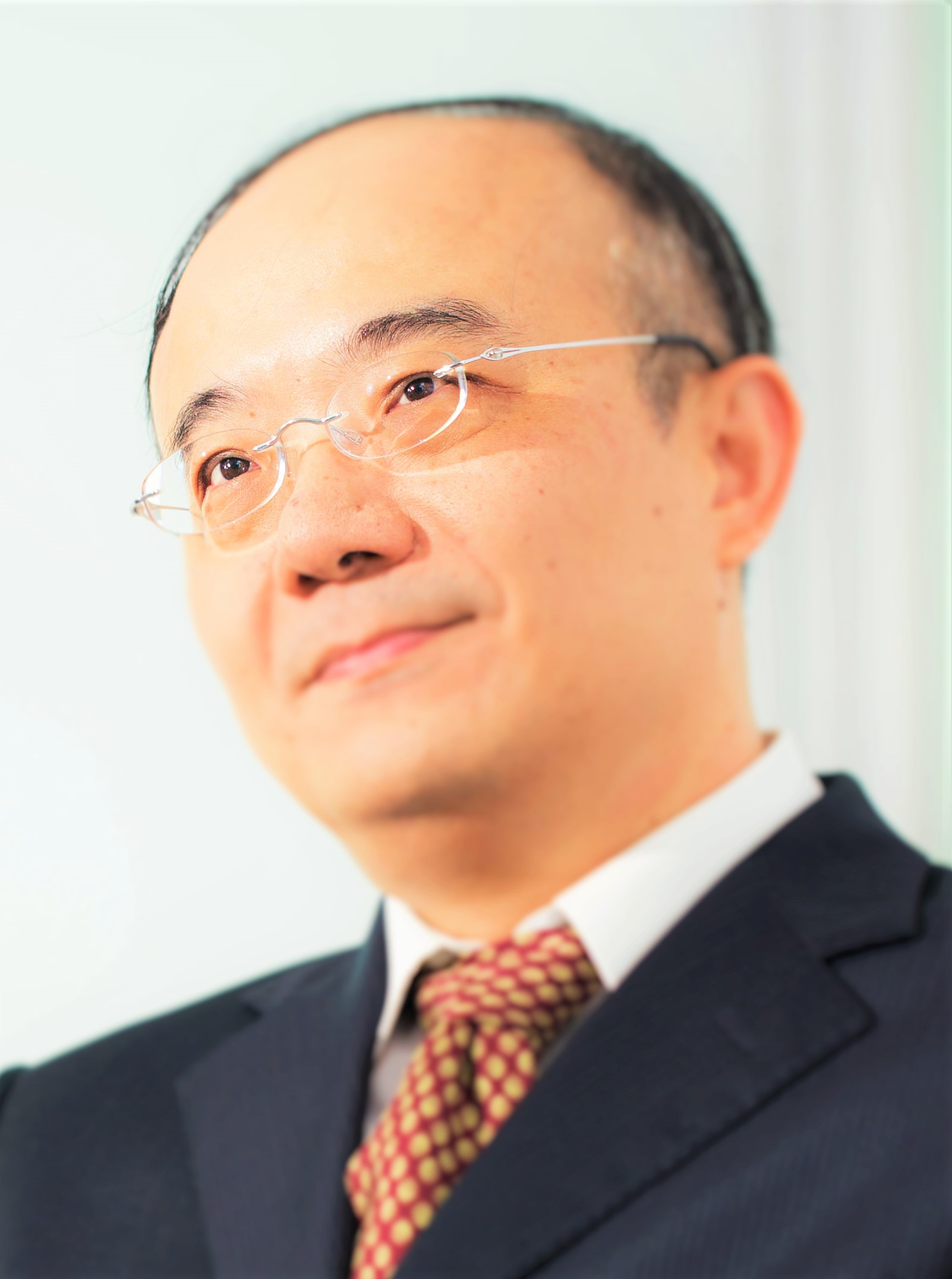
Chairperson of National Communications Commission of Republic of China (Taiwan) Shyr-Hau Shyr

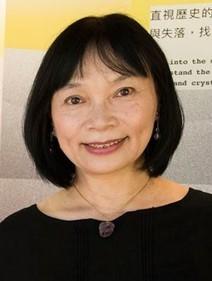
Chairperson of Transitional Justice Commission of Republic of China (Taiwan) Yang Tsui

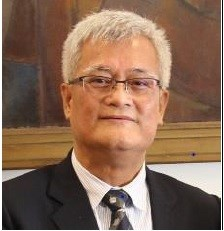
Chairperson of Council of Indigenous Peoples of Republic of China (Taiwan) Paelabang Danapan

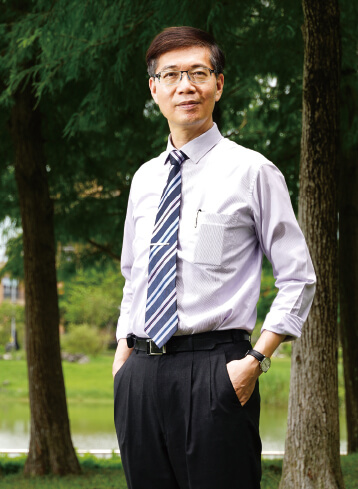
Chairperson of Research, Development and Evaluation Commission of Republic of China (Taiwan) Chu Chin-Peng

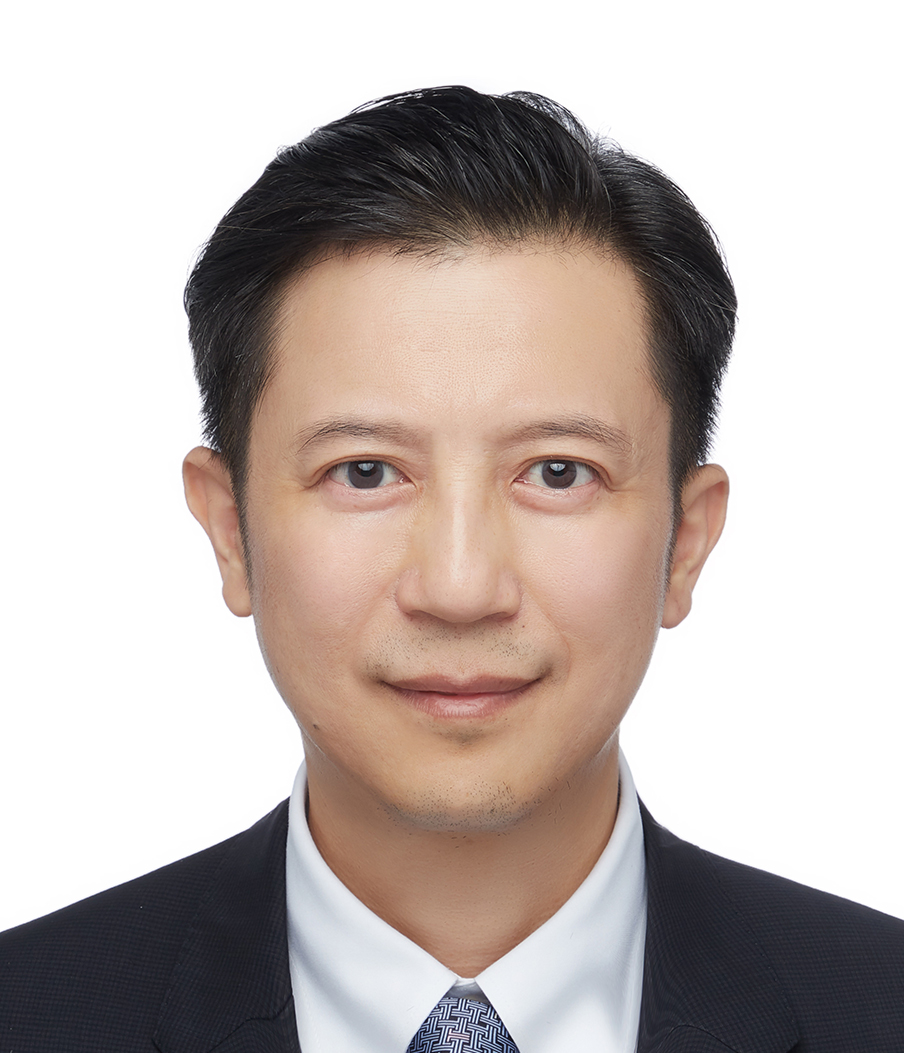
Vice Chairperson of Financial Supervisory Commission of Republic of China (Taiwan) Chen Yen-Liang

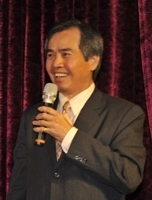
Vice Chairperson of Mainland Affairs Council of Republic of China (Taiwan) Kao Chang
