= NDHU College of Indigenous Studies =

School of Indigenous Studies of National Dong Hwa University (NDHU)

- 國立東華大學原住民民族學院
- Seal of NDHU College of Indigenous Studies
- Type: National (Public); Indigenous Studies
- Established: 2001
- Parent institution: National Dong Hwa University
- Affiliations: Global Council for Anthropological Linguistics
- Dean: Chung-Shan Shih, PhD (Amis)
- Faculty: 32 (Fall 2024)
- Students: 701 (Spring 2023)
- Undergraduates: 552 (Spring 2023)
- Postgraduates: 149 (Spring 2023)
- Doctoral students: 28 (Spring 2023)
- Location: Shoufeng, Hualien, Taiwan
- Campus: Shoufeng Campus
- Website: CIS.NDHU.edu.tw

Chinese name
- Traditional Chinese: 國立東華大學原住民民族學院
- Simplified Chinese: 国立东华大学原住民民族学院
Transcriptions
Standard Mandarin
- Hanyu Pinyin: Guólì Dōnghuá Dàxué Yuánzhùmín Mínzú Xuéyuàn
- Bopomofo: ㄍㄨㄛˊ ㄌㄧˋ ㄉㄨㄥ ㄏㄨㄚˊ ㄉㄚˋ ㄒㄩㄝˊ ㄩㄢˊ ㄓㄨˋ ㄇㄧㄣˊ ㄇㄧㄣˊ ㄗㄨˊ ㄒㄩㄝˊ ㄩㄢˋ
Hakka
- Romanization: Guedˋ Lib Dungˊ Vaˇ Tai Hog Ngienˇ Cu Minˇ Minˇ Cug Hog Ien
Southern Min
- Tâi-lô: Kok-li̍p Tong-huâ Tāi-ha̍k Guân-tsū-bîn Bîn-tso̍k Ha̍k-īnn

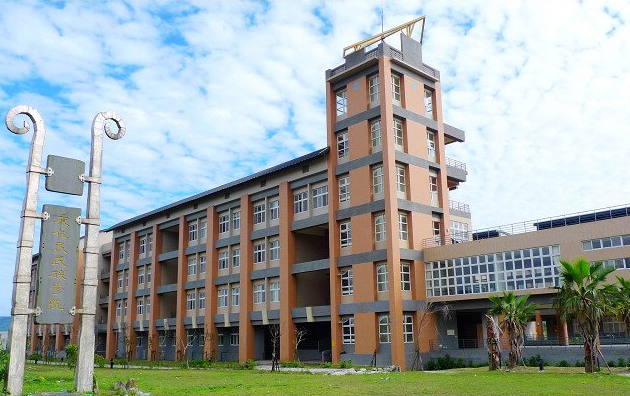
A view of NDHU College of Indigenous Studies

NDHU College of Indigenous Studies (NDHU CIS; Chinese: 國立東華大學原住民民族學院; pinyin: Dōnghuá yuánzhùmín mínzú Xuéyuàn) is a school of Indigenous Studies at National Dong Hwa University (NDHU). Founded in 2001, it traces its root back to the Graduate Institute of Ethnic Relations and Cultures in 1995 with Professor Chiao Chien, the Professor of Anthropology at Indiana University Bloomington and Founding Chair of Anthropology at Chinese University of Hong Kong, as Founding Director.

NDHU CIS is Taiwan's oldest school for Indigenous Studies and Taiwan's most prominent think tank for indigenous issues. NDHU CIS is commonly regarded as Taiwan's premier academic institution for Indigenous Studies, its MSS program in Ethnic Relations and Cultures has been selected as one of Taiwan's eight programs for the Fulbright Program. The first Fulbright Scholar to complete the MSS degree was Steven Bernstein.

The college's student body comprises an equal proportion of indigenous and Han Chinese students, which has academic partnerships in teaching and research with Global Council for Anthropological Linguistics of SOAS University of London, UCLouvain, University of Ottawa, Macquarie University, Western Sydney University, University of Waikato. In 2025, NDHU CIS joined as one of universities at Horizon Europe.

== History ==
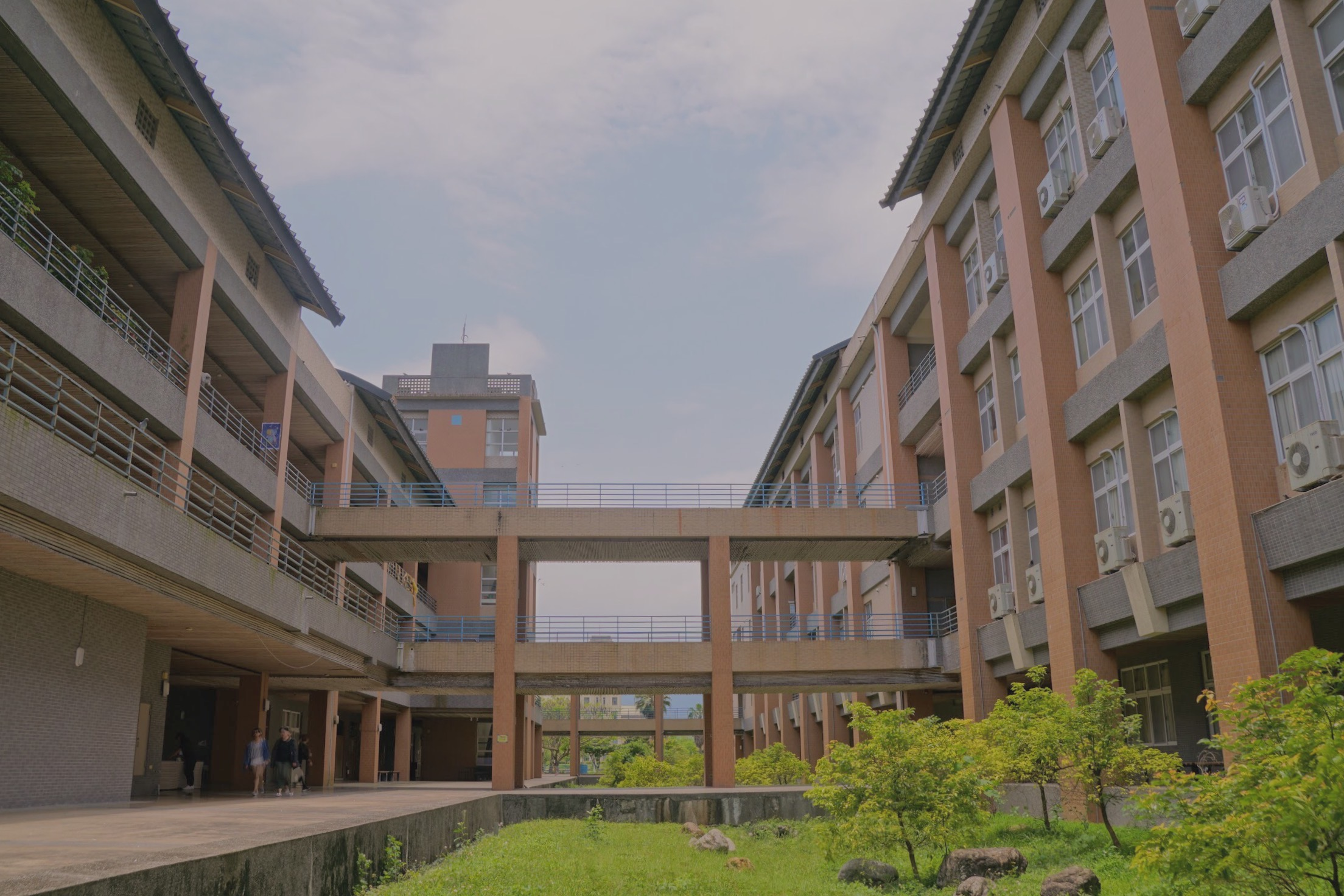
NDHU College of Indigenous Studies Building (2020)

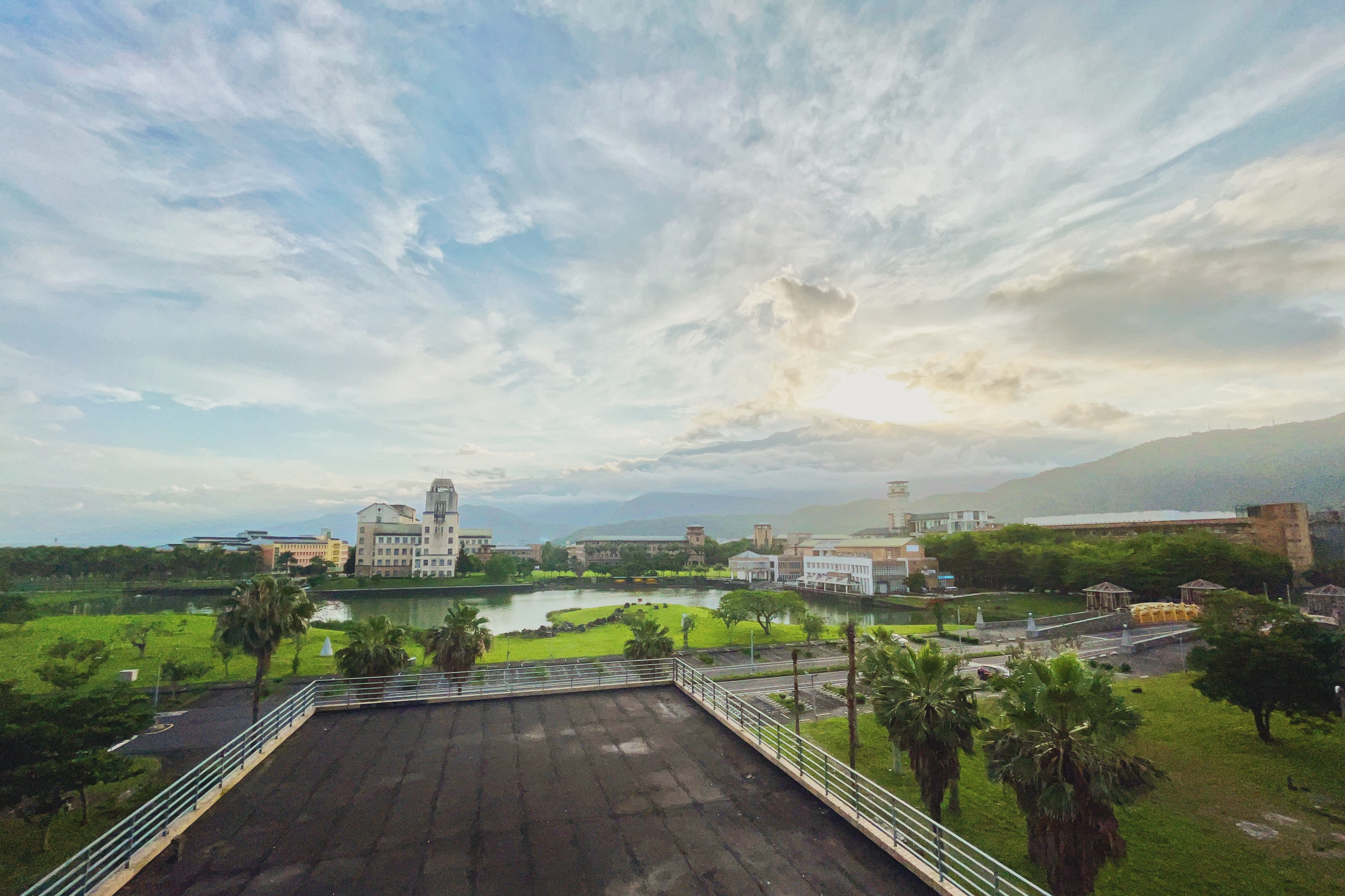
View of NDHU College of Indigenous Studies Building

=== Graduate Institute of Ethnic Relations and Cultures ===
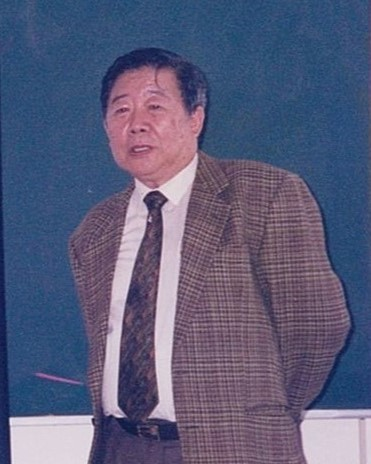
Chiao Chien, Founding Chair of Anthropology at Chinese University of Hong Kong and Laureate of Chinese Lifetime Achievement Award in Anthropology (2015)

NDHU Graduate Institute of Ethnic Relations and Cultures (GIERC) was founded in 1994 with Chiao Chien, the Professor of Anthropology at Indiana University Bloomington and Founding Chair of Anthropology at Chinese University of Hong Kong, as Founding Director. NDHU GIERC is Taiwan's first academic institution to offer Master of Social Science in Ethnic Relations and Cultures and first institution dedicated to Ethnic Relations and Cultural studies, which is founded in Hualien, the home to many of Taiwan's indigenous Austronesian peoples.

=== Foundation ===
With support and funding from Council of Indigenous Peoples (CIP) and from Ministry of Education (MOE), NDHU College of Indigenous Studies (NDHU CIS) was founded in 2001 as Taiwan's first institution for Indigenous Studies to serve the social development and cultural revitalization of Taiwanese indigenous peoples. Meanwhile, NDHU CIS established Graduate Institute of Indigenous Development, Department of Indigenous Culture, Department of Indigenous Language and Communication, and Center for Indigenous In-service Education to serve its mission to indigenous issue, which are Taiwan's first of its kind.

In 2004, NDHU CIS established Graduate Institute of Indigenous Art to serve the development and preservation of Indigenous arts and cultures. In 2007, NDHU CIS established the Department of Indigenous Affair, Interdisciplinary Undergraduate Program of Indigenous Studies, and Undergraduate Program of Indigenous Social Work to serve the issues in social work, social change, culture change, public administration of Indigenous People.

=== Nowadays ===
With the merger of National Dong Hwa University and National Hualien University of Education, NDHU CIS's Graduate Institute of Indigenous Art was moved to the newly established NDHU College of The Arts in 2009 to provide broader training in Arts Management and Creative Work. In 2010, the Department of Indigenous Development and Social Work was established through the merger of Graduate Institute of Indigenous Development, Department of Indigenous Affair, and Undergraduate Program of Indigenous Social Work. In 2012, it founded the Indigenous Culture and Communication Center and hosted 2012 Annual General Meeting & International Conference of The World Indigenous Nations Higher Education Consortium (WINHEC).

In 2014, NDHU CIS established the Center for International Indigenous Affairs to broaden its research and cooperation network and found international alliance of Indigenous Studies to New Zealand, Australia, United States, and established the Center of Indigenous Students Resources.

In 2016, the Indigenous Historical Justice and Transitional Justice Committee (IHJTJC) was established by President of Taiwan, Tsai Ing-Wen, as a national milestone for Transitional justice of Indigenous People. Almost subcommittee conveners were from the faculties of NDHU CIS, including the Subcommittee on Land – Awi Mona (Seediq; Professor of Law), Subcommittee on Languages – Masegeseg Z. Gadu (Paiwan; Dean of NDHU CIS), Subcommittee on History – Su-chen Lin (Amis; Professor of Ethnic Relations and Culture), Subcommittee on Reconciliation – Jolan Hsieh (Siraya; Professor of Ethnic Relations and Culture).

In response to Education Act for Indigenous Peoples in Taiwan, NDHU CIS founded the Center for Indigenous Language Learning (CILR) and Center for Indigenous Curriculum Development Collaboration (CICDC) in 2018 with support from Council of Indigenous Peoples (CIP) to serve the learning of Indigenous language, curriculum development, and cultivation of teachers for Indigenous Education in Taiwan's compulsory Education.

In 2019, NDHU CIS established Bachelor Program of Indigenous Performance and Arts to serve as preservation and development purpose of Indigenous Performance and Arts. In 2020, NDHU CIS's BA and MSS Program in Ethnic Relations and Cultures were selected as one of eight programs in Taiwan's Fulbright Program, the first batch of four Fulbright students were from Ivy league. In 2022, with funding from Council of Indigenous Peoples (CIP), NDHU CIS established Taiwan's "Indigenous Language Immersion Preschool Center" and "Indigenous Education, Culture, and Knowledge System Center", which was responsible for establishment of Taiwan's indigenous Preschool Education, Indigenous Educational System, cultural revitalization, and establishment of Indigenous Knowledge System.

In 2023, NDHU CIS established Taiwan's 1st International PhD program in Indigenous Studies, and the University of Chicago Committee on International Relations visited NDHU CIS for academic exchange of issues in Taiwan's Indigenous Social Change, Indigenous Cultural Conservation, Post-disaster Reconstruction, Indigenous Language Education, and Indigenous Health. The Atlantic Council Millennium Fellows Cohort visit NDHU CIS for Taiwanese indigenous cultures and arts.

== Academic organization ==
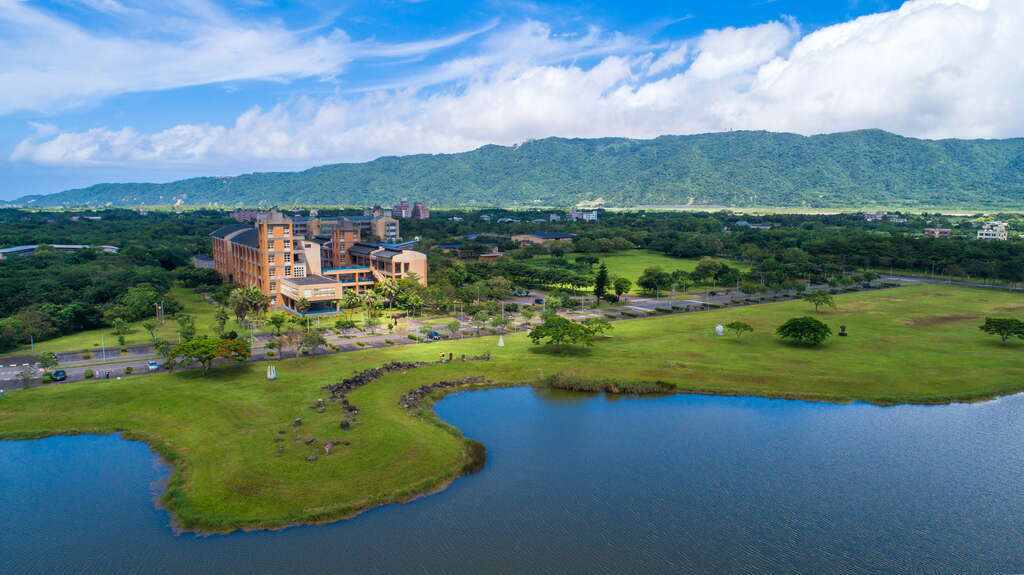
NDHU Dong Lake and College of Indigenous Studies

=== Departments ===
- Department of Ethnic Relations and Cultures (ERC)
- Department of Indigenous Languages and Communication (ILC)
- Department of Indigenous Development and Social Work (IDSW)

=== Centers ===
==== Research Centers ====
- Center for International Indigenous Affairs (CIIA)
- Center of Indigenous Development (CID)
- Center for Taiwanese Indigenous Knowledge System Construction (TIKAC)
- Center of Indigenous Curriculum Development and Cooperation (ICDC)
- Indigenous Students Resource Center (ISRC)
- Indigenous Culture and Communication Center (ICCC)
- Indigenous Language Learning Center (ILLC)

== Academic programs ==
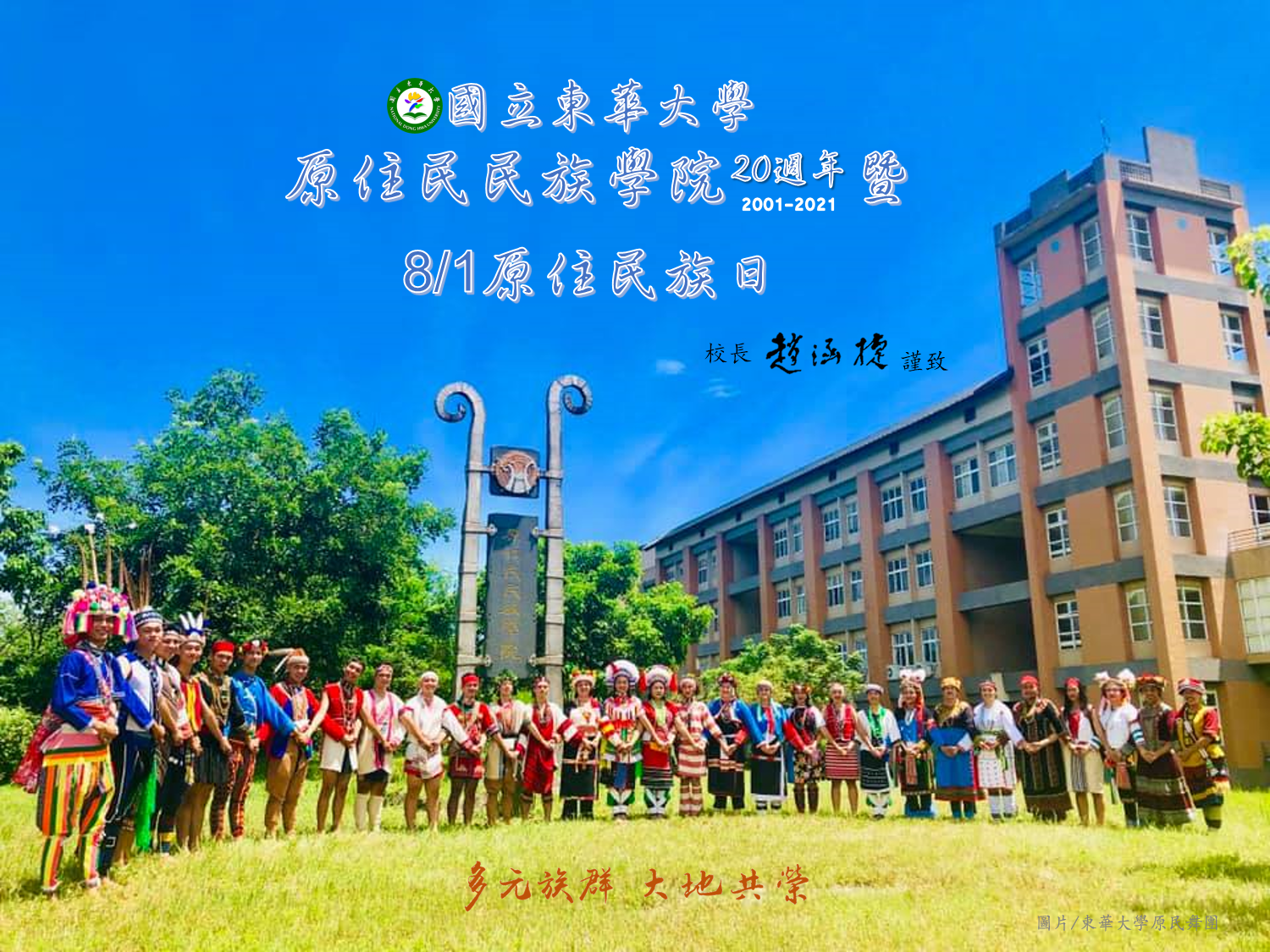
The 20th Anniversary Celebration of NDHU College of Indigenous Studies on the Indigenous Peoples' Day

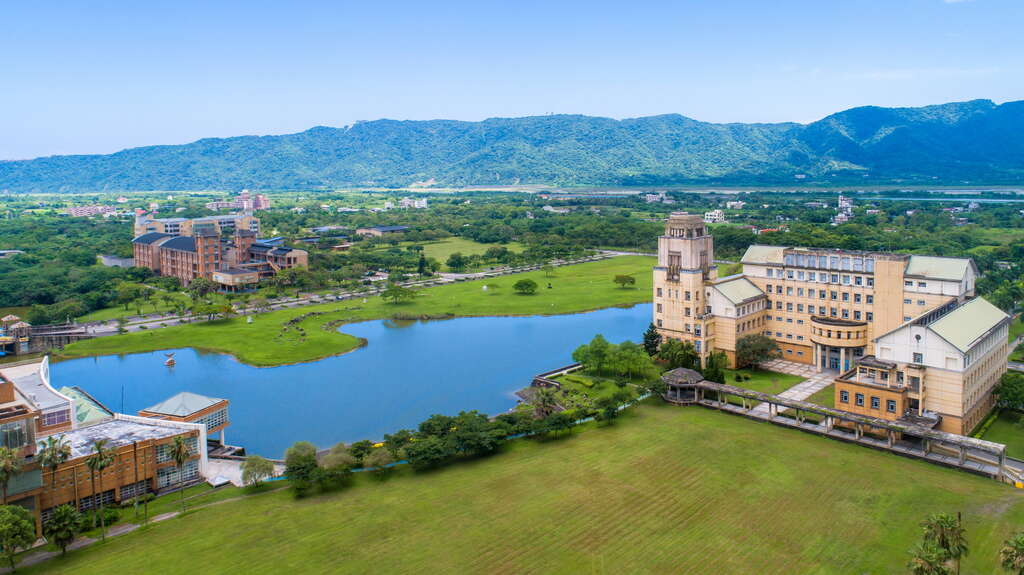
NDHU Dong Lake

=== Graduate ===
==== Doctor of Philosophy (PhD) ====
The Doctoral program (PhD) at NDHU College of Indigenous Studies is a full-time, in-residence program intended for students who plan scholarly careers involving research and teaching in Indigenous Studies. There are two PhD programs:

- PhD in Indigenous Studies (International)
- PhD in Ethnic Relations and Cultures

==== Master of Social Science (MSS) ====
Master of Social Science (MSS) has two major tracks for Master's students to follow at NDHU College of Indigenous Studies:

- MSS in Ethnic Relations and Cultures
- MSS in Indigenous Development and Social Work

==== Master of Social Work (MSW) ====
Master of Social Work (MSW) at NDHU College of Indigenous Studies is a social work program with a focus on issues affecting indigenous people, including health care, post-disaster reconstruction, crime, social welfare at individual, children, family, and community levels.

=== Undergraduate ===
NDHU College of Indigenous Studies offers five programs in different majors.

- Bachelor of Arts (BA) in Ethnic Relations and Cultures
- Bachelor of Arts (BA) in Indigenous Languages and Communication
- Bachelor of Social Work (BSW) in Indigenous Social Work
- Bachelor of Social Science (BSS) in Indigenous Development
- Bachelor of Indigenous Arts (BIA) in Indigenous Performance and Arts

These programs operate on a modular system, allowing students to design their curricula and manage their study pace. They may also take interested modules, subject to prerequisite requirements and modules availability.

=== Dual Degree ===
==== NDHU-Macquarie ====
NDHU College of Indigenous Studies offers a dual PhD degree in partnership with Macquarie University School of Social Sciences Geography and Planning Division in Sydney, under a joint doctoral supervision model.

==== NDHU-UCLouvain ====
NDHU CIS also offers a dual PhD degree in partnership with UCLouvain Louvain School of Political and Social Sciences (PSAD) in Belgium.

== Reputation and Publications ==
=== Reputation ===
- National Dong Hwa University; College of Indigenous Studies Rankings

Global Ranking
| QS Art and Design | 95 (2026) |
| QS Performing Art | 101-150 (2026) |
| QS Social Sciences and Management‌ | 501-550 (2025) |
| SCImage Gender Studies | 197 (2026) |

National Ranking
| QS Art and Design | 1 (2026) |
| QS Performing Art | 1 (2026) |
| QS Social Sciences and Management‌ | 9 (2025) |
| SCImage Gender Studies | 1 (2026) |

NDHU College of Indigenous Studies's was ranked 1st in Taiwan (15th in Asia) for Art & Design, 1st in Taiwan (21st in Asia) for Performing Art, and 9th in Taiwan (147th in Asia) for Social Sciences and Management‌ by QS World Subject Ranking.

In 2026, SCImago Journal and Institutions Rank ranked NDHU CIS 1st in Taiwan (14th in Asia) for Gender Studies, making the NDHU CIS the only Taiwanese university featured in this ranking.

=== Taiwan Journal of Indigenous Studies ===
Taiwan Journal of Indigenous Studies (TJIS, Chinese: 台灣原住民族研究 ISSN 2070-9730) was first published in 2008. TJIS aims to promote interdisciplinary research and enhance the understanding of indigenous cultures, indigenous art, indigenous language, ethnodevelopment, Traditional knowledge, and Indigenous politics, particularly in Taiwan and the wider Austronesian region. Since its inception, TJIS has become a prominent platform for academic research in indigenous studies. TJIS is Taiwan's leading journal in the fields of anthropology, indigenous studies, and Austronesian Studies, and is ranked fifth among humanities journals in Taiwan.

== Student organizations ==
- Mother Tongue Hut (Sapah Kari)
- NDHU Radio
- NDHU Millet Garden
- NDHU Ramie Garden
- NDHU CIS Dance Troupe

== Partnership ==
=== Council of Indigenous Peoples (CIP) ===
NDHU College of Indigenous Studies has long strong tie with Taiwan's Council of Indigenous Peoples (CIP). The college was largely funded by CIP and served as the think tank in indigenous issues for CIP. In response to its founding mission, NDHU CIS was responsible for policy-research and administration from Council of Indigenous Peoples (CIP), including "Indigenous Curriculum Development", "Indigenous Language Immersion Preschool Center", "Indigenous Education, Culture, and Knowledge System Center".

=== EU BIRGEJUPMI ===
NDHU College of Indigenous Studies joined the BIRGEJUPMI project since 2025, funded by the EU’s Horizon Europe program. The project focuses on Arctic coastal regions, integrating Indigenous, Western, and local knowledge for community-driven environmental decision-making. Key objectives include documenting Indigenous marine and coastal management practices, assessing climate change adaptation impacts, and exploring sea- and landscapes as archives for Traditional Ecological Knowledge-based governance.

Through the BIRGEJUPMI project, NDHU CIS partnered with University of Copenhagen from Denmark, University of Tartu from Estonia, University of Tromsø from Norway, and GFZ Helmholtz Centre for Geosciences from Germany, combining expertise in Indigenous studies, geosciences, and environmental sustainability. These collaborations enhance interdisciplinary research on Arctic ecosystems and governance practices.

=== Advanced Forum of Anthropology (AFA) ===
NDHU College of Indigenous Studies was the founding institute of Advanced Forum of Anthropology (AFA; Chinese: 人類學高等論壇), which is regarded the supreme academic society of Anthropology in Chinese-speaking world, and NDHU CIS faculty Chiao Chien served AFA's founding president.

The AFA was founded in 2002 by twenty two leading institutes for anthropology across China, Taiwan, Hong Kong, and Macau. The founding institutes includes National Dong Hwa University College of Indigenous Studies, Chinese Academy of Social Sciences Institute of Ethnology and Anthropology, Peking University Institute of Anthropology, Chinese University of Hong Kong Department of Anthropology, Hong Kong University of Science and Technology South China Research Center, University of Macau Faculty of Arts & Humanities and Faculty of Social Sciences.

== People ==
Notable present and past NDHU College of Indigenous Studies faculty include:

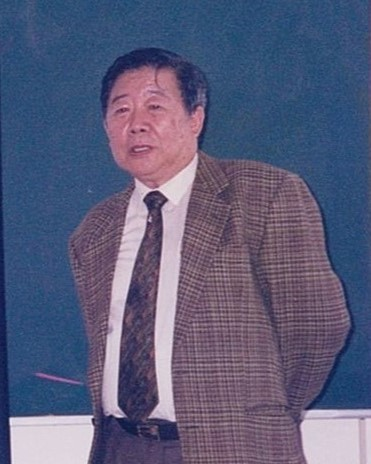
Laureate of Chinese Lifetime Achievement Award in Anthropology (2015) Chiao Chien

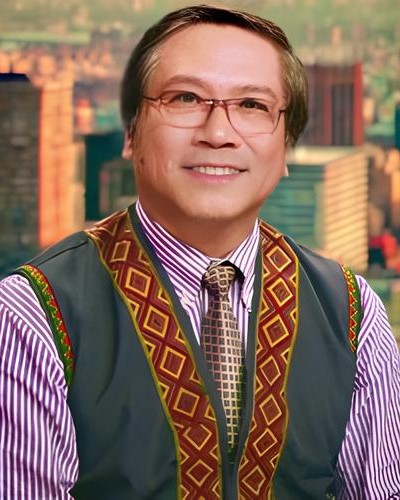
Laureate of First Class Indigenous Medal of Republic of China (Taiwan) (2024) Kao Teh-I

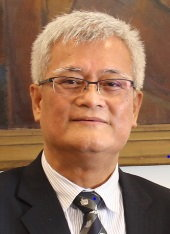
Chairperson of Council of Indigenous Peoples of Republic of China (Taiwan) Paelabang Danapan

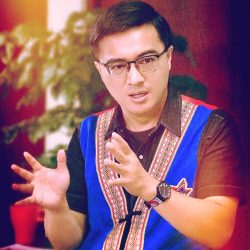
Vice Chairperson of Council of Indigenous Peoples of Republic of China (Taiwan) Tunkan Tansikian

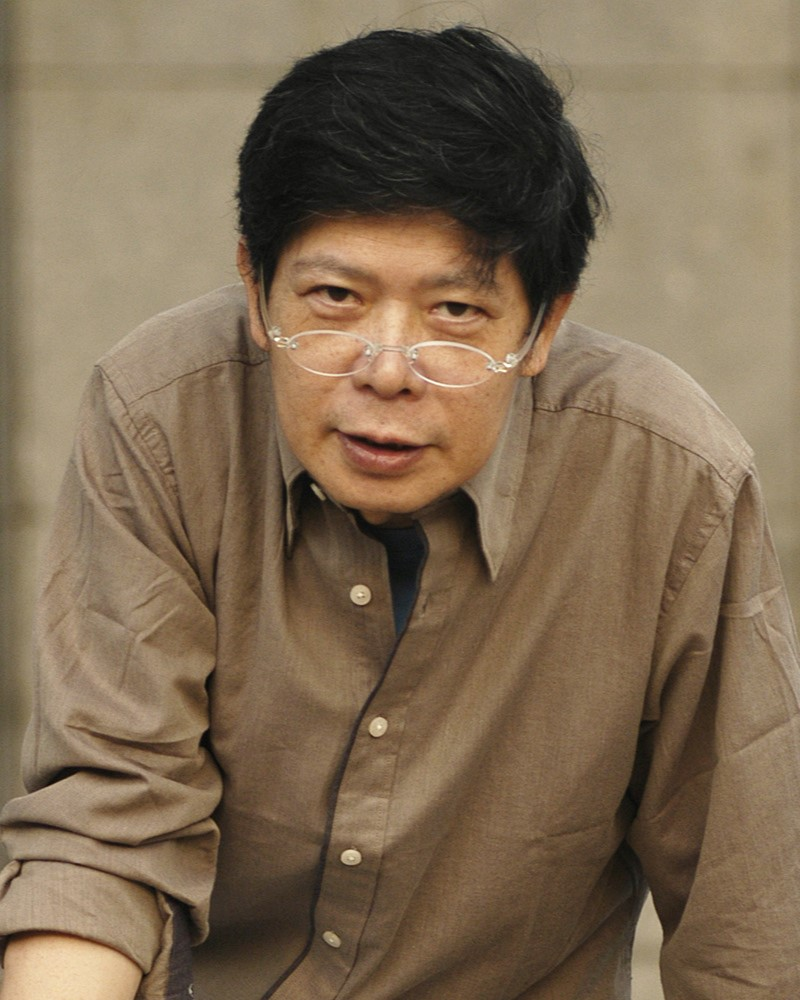
The Master of Chinese Psychology Yee Der-Huey

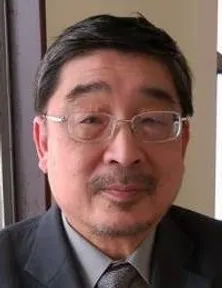
Political science scholar and practitioner Shih Cheng-Feng

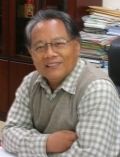
Director of National Museum of Prehistory Tung, Chun-Fa

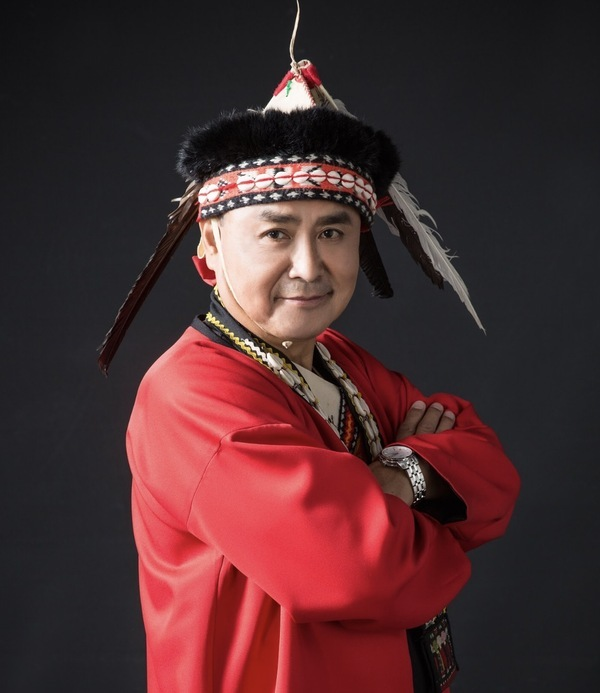
Director of National Museum of Prehistory Pasuya Poiconu

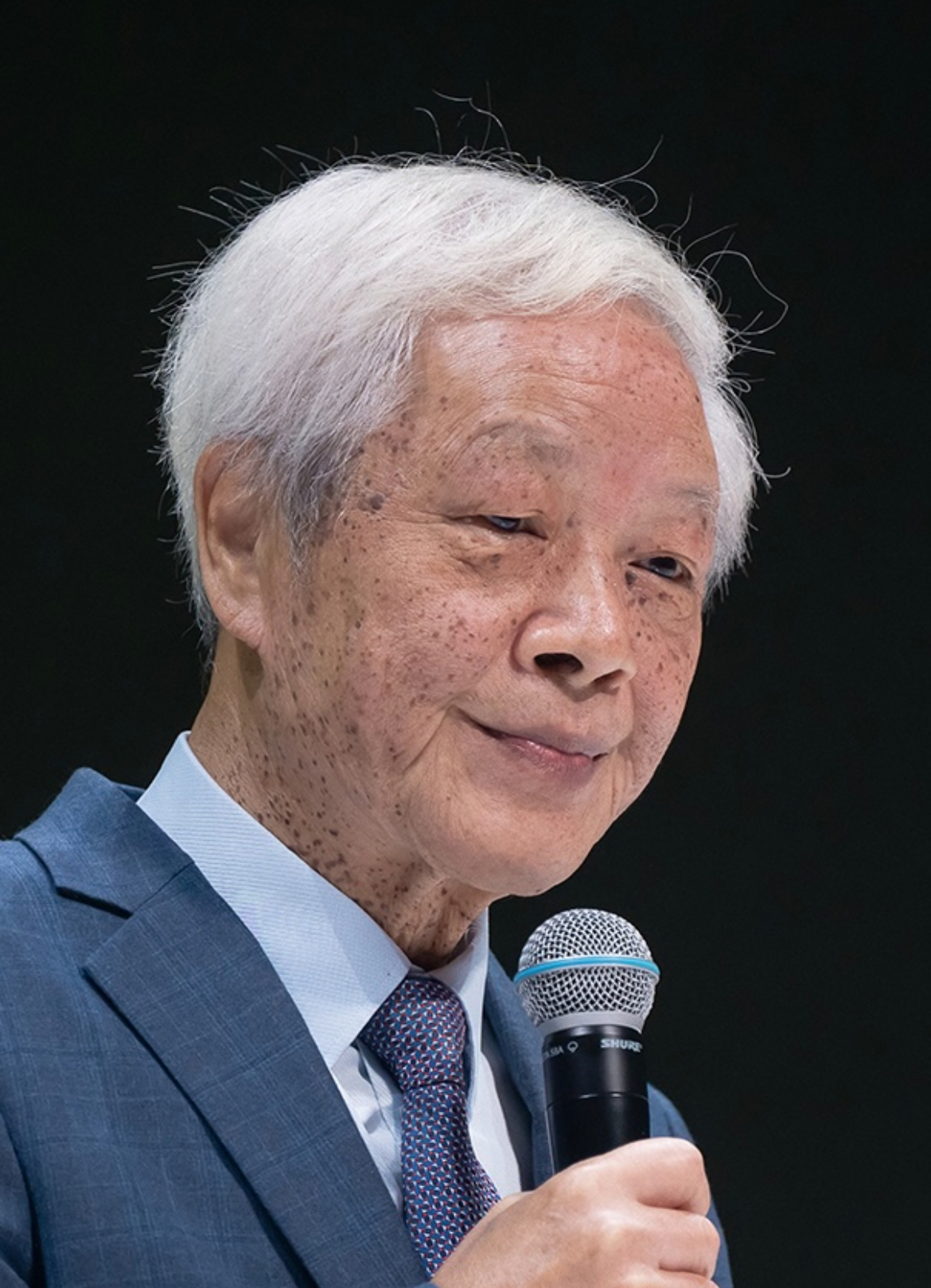
Chairman of National Culture and Arts Foundation Lin Chi-Yang
