= Policide =

Intentional destruction of an independent political and social entity

Policide in political science describes the intentional destruction of an independent political or social entity. Sometimes, the related word "politicide" is used in this meaning. The term is used with some regularity within political science, generally to refer to a policy of destruction that falls short of genocide or ethnocide.

== Origin ==
Writer Michael Walzer credits the origin of the term "policide" (here, meaning the "destruction of a state's independence") to Abba Eban, Israel's foreign minister in 1967.

Similarly, professor Steve J. Stern has adopted "policide" to mean the destruction of political life itself. Stern describes the term as an extension of a family of terms including homicide, patricide, tyrannicide, genocide, democide, and ethnocide. Stern uses the term "policide," rooted in the Greek term polis (πόλις) for "city-state" or "body politic," in order to describe what he characterizes as "a systematic project to destroy an entire way of doing and understanding politics and governance" in Chile under the governance of Augusto Pinochet.

== Examples ==
- In Writing Ground Zero, John Whittier Treat refers several times to the destruction of Hiroshima and Nagasaki as "policide."
- In Circle of Goods, Tressa Lynn Berman describes United States policy towards Native Americans as a historical process shifting from ethnocide into "policide."
- The term "policide" frequently arises with respect to the intention to eradicate the state of Israel. Yossi Beilin discusses Israeli Prime Minister Benjamin Netanyahu's use of the term to describe the Palestine Liberation Organization's claim that it is dedicated to the ultimate destruction of the state of Israel. Netanyahu has continued to use the term in his writings and speeches, for example writing that "Arafat pursues a goal of 'policide' - the destruction of the Jewish state, by employing the means of suicide and mass terror". The declared intention of Hamas, Palestinian Islamic Jihad, Hezbollah and Iran's President Mahmoud Ahmadinejad is the destruction of Israel and this had led to claims that Arab/Muslim groups support the notion of policide regarding Israel.
- Israeli sociologist Baruch Kimmerling uses the term in his book Politicide: Sharon’s War Against the Palestinians and in various articles. He defines "the politicide of the Palestinian people, a gradual but systematic attempt to cause their annihilation as an independent political and social entity." This he believed has been present throughout Israel's confrontations with the Palestinians, but was epitomised by the thoughts and actions of Ariel Sharon.
- The city of Nishapur, a Persian city in modern-day Iran, was sacked and destroyed by the Mongols in 1221. In retaliation for the death of the son-in-law of Genghis Khan, around 1.75 million inhabitants of the city were systematically killed. A great number of their skulls were reputedly piled in pyramids outside the city walls.

== See also ==
- Murder – Unlawful killing of a human with malice
- Politicide – Eliminating groups of people for political reasons
- Tyrannicide – Killing of a tyrant or unjust ruler
