= Lin Yaohua =

Chinese sociologist and anthropologist

- Born: March 27, 1910; Gutian County, Fujian
- Died: November 27, 2000 (aged 90); Beijing, China
- Occupations: sociologist and anthropologist

Lin Yaohua (Chinese: 林耀华; pinyin: Lín Yàohuá, March 27, 1910 – November 27, 2000) was a leading Chinese sociologist and anthropologist. He was noted for his studies of Chinese family structures, as well as work on China's minority ethnic groups, particularly the Yi people. He also collaborated with Fei Xiaotong on works about ethnology in China.

== Life ==
Lin Yaohua was born in Gutian County, Fujian, on March 27, 1910. In 1935, he earned his master's degree from Yenching University. In 1940, he earned a Ph.D. in Anthropology from Harvard University.

== Major works ==
- The Golden Wing: A Sociological Study of Chinese Family. London: Routledge, Kegan Paul, 1947.
- Liang shan yi jia 《凉山彝家》. Beijing, Commercial Press, 1944. Translated as "The Lolo of Lingshan": New Haven, CT" Human Relations Area Files, 1961.
- Cong yuan dao ren de yanjiu 《从猿到人的研究》 (Research from apes to humans). Beijing, Beijing Gengyun Chubanshe, 1951.
- Yuanshi shehui shi 《原始社会史》 (On the History of primitive society). Beijing, Zhonghua shuju, 1984.
- Fuxi jiazu gongshe xingtai yanjiu《父系家族公社形态研究》 (The Structure of Patriarchal Society) Qinghai, Qinghai Renmin Chubanshe, 1984.
- Cong shuzhai dao tianye 《从书斋到田野》 (From the study to the open fields) Beijing, Zhongyang Minzu Daxue Chubanshe, 2000.
