= Yang Mu =

Taiwanese poet (1940–2020)

- 王靖獻
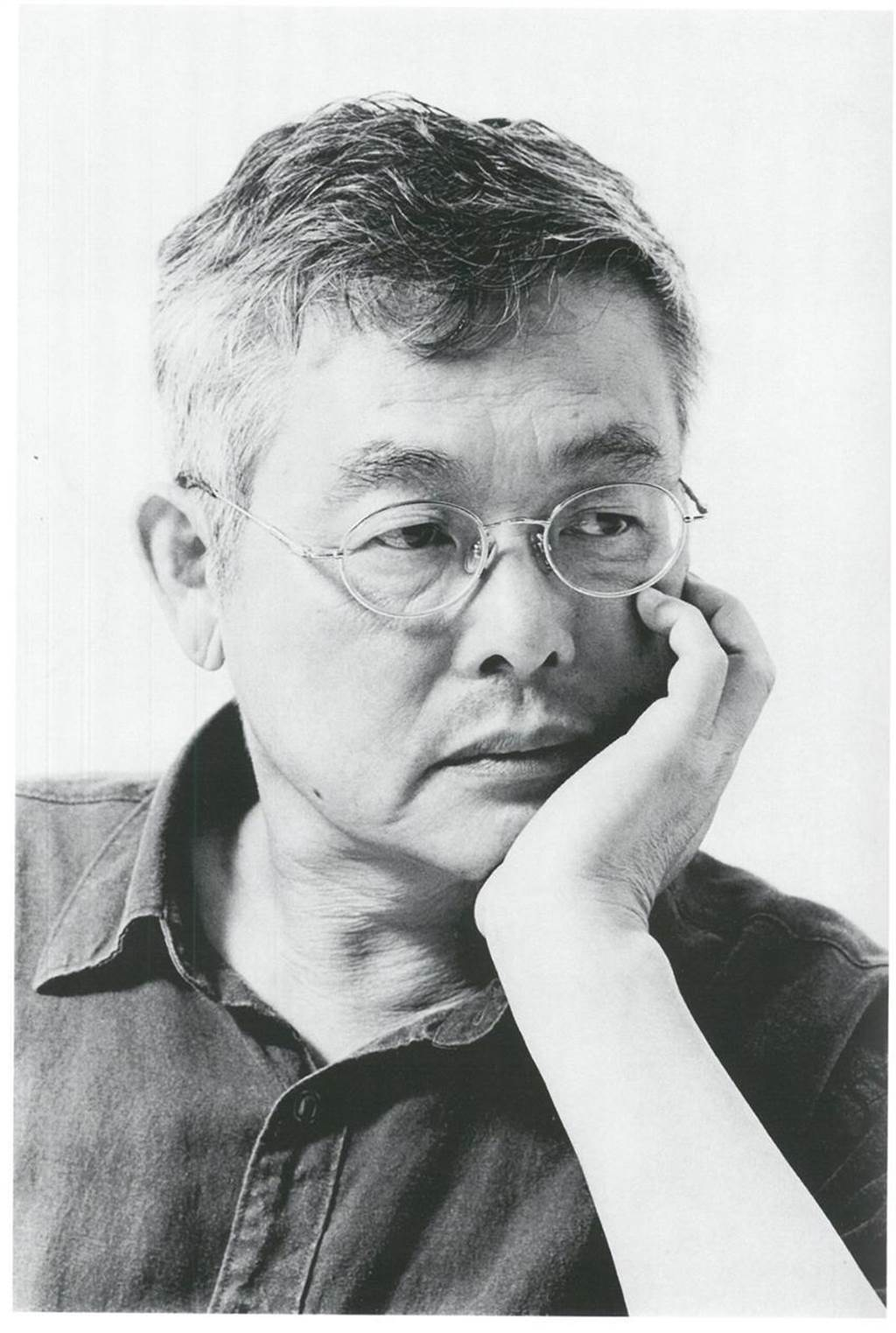
- Born: Wang Ching-hsien; 6 September 1940; Hualien County, Taiwan
- Died: 13 March 2020 (aged 79); Cathay General Hospital, Taipei, Taiwan
- Resting place: Hualien County, Taiwan
- Education: Tunghai University (BA); University of Iowa (MFA); University of California, Berkeley (PhD)
- Occupations: poet, essayist, critic, translator, professor in classical Chinese literature
- Writing career
- Language: Chinese, English, Old English, German
- Period: 1956–2020
- Genres: poetry, prose
- Notable awards: National Culture and Arts Award (國家文藝獎); Best Chinese Writing in the World (世界華文文學獎); Newman Prize for Chinese Literature (紐曼華語文學獎） Cikada Prize (瑞典蟬獎）
- Website: yangmu.com

Wang Ching-hsien (王靖獻; September 6, 1940 – March 13, 2020), known by his pen name Yang Mu (Chinese: 楊牧; pinyin: Yáng Mù), was a Taiwanese poet, essayist, critic, translator, Professor Emeritus of Comparative Literature at the University of Washington, and founding dean at NDHU College of Humanities and Social Sciences and HKUST School of Humanities and Social Sciences. He is considered one of the most accomplished poets writing in Chinese in the 20th and 21st century, known for his lyricism and linguistic ingenuity, modernising the Chinese diction and syntax while reviving a sublime style out of the idiom and imagery of Chinese and Western poetic traditions.

Yang Mu was praised by Swedish Academy member Göran Malmqvist, who translated his work into Swedish, as the closest Taiwanese poet to the Nobel Prize. He was the first Taiwanese winner of Newman Prize for Chinese Literature (2013) and Cikada Prize (2016).

== Biography ==
Yang was born as Wang Ching-hsien on 6 September 1940 in Hualien County, Taiwan. When he was 16, only a high school student, he started off publishing his own works in several poetry magazines such as Blue Star, Modern Poetry and Genesis under the pen name Yeh Shan (葉珊). Originally majoring in history at Tunghai University, he later found that it went against his genuine interest and finally transferred to the Department of Foreign Languages to pursue his literary ideals. At that time, he exposed himself to British romantic poetry and was influenced by some defining figures of the English Romantic Movement, like William Wordsworth, Lord Byron, Percy Bysshe Shelley, and John Keats.

After his graduation from Tunghai University, Yang chose to go to the United States for further study. In 1966, he obtained his Master of Fine Arts (English: creative writing) at the University of Iowa. While pursuing master's studies at Iowa, Yang wrote 15 letters to Keats. This practice ended after Yang left Iowa. Notably, a group of writers who later have become leading figures in the literary scene in contemporary Taiwan like Pai Hsien-yung, Yu Kwang-chung, Wai-lim Yip, and Wang Wen-hsing, were all his alumni at UI. And in 1971, he gained Ph.D. of comparative literature at the University of California, Berkeley. His studying in America, obviously, contributed to the changes of his poetry style. Since 1972, he has written a series of works to convey his deep concern about the social reality under his new pen name Yang Mu (楊牧). Changing from emphasizing sentimental and romantic feelings to intervening in social issues, the works in Yang's later period appear to be more calm, reserved and profound.

Yang used to teach at National Taiwan University (1975–76, 1983–84), Princeton University (1978–79), and Hong Kong University of Science and Technology (1991–94); during 1996-2001 he was professor of Chinese literature and founding dean of the College of Humanities and Social Sciences at National Dong Hwa University in Hualien, Taiwan; and during 2002–06, the distinguished research fellow and director in the Institute of Chinese Literature and Philosophy at Academia Sinica in Taipei, Taiwan. He later became professor emeritus of comparative literature at the University of Washington and Chair Professor of Taiwanese Literature at National Chengchi University.

Yang was admitted to Cathay General Hospital in Taipei in March 2020, where he lapsed into a coma. He died on March 13, 2020, aged 79.

== Major works ==
As a prolific writer, Yang published 14 poetry collections, 15 prose collections and 1 verse play. His early works include On the Water Margin (水之湄), Flower Season (花季), Lantern Boat (燈船) and Legends (傳說). These poetry collections were published under the pen name Ye Shan (葉珊) and were publicly thought to have created a new way of writing romantic poems.

Later, he was known to his readers as Yang Mu (楊牧) and published 12 other poetry collections such as Manuscripts Sealed in a Bottle (瓶中稿), Songs of the Little Dipper (北斗行), A Game of Taboos (禁忌的遊戲), The Coast with Seven Turns (海岸七疊), Someone (有人) A Complete Fable (完整的寓言), Ventures (涉事), Diaspsis Patelliformi (介殼蟲), Songs long and short (長短歌行) and so forth. Among them, Songs of the Little Dipper (北斗行) published in 1978, was prefaced by the famous Taiwanese novelist Wang Wen-hsing. In this preface, Wang spoke highly of its success in applying language and said that it took an important step towards achieving the new order of modern Chinese poetry.

Wu Feng: A Play in Four Acts (吳鳳), a verse play published in 1979, was another notable work. Through the narration of a story based on Taiwanese history, Yang expressed his praise for benevolence and human rationality. As a versatile writer, Yang's prose collections have also received much recognition. These works are mainly represented by Annual Ring (年輪), Storms over Hills and Ocean (山風海雨), The Completion of a Poem (一首詩的完成), The Midday Hawk (亭午之鷹) and Then as I Went Leaving (昔我往矣). They share some common themes, ranging from hometown memories to social criticism.

Yang's works have been translated into English, German, French, Japanese, Swedish Dutch, etc. No trace of the Gardener: Poems of Yang Mu (translated by Lawrence R. Smith & Michelle Yeh, New Haven: Ct. Yale University Press, 1998), The Forbidden Game and Video Poems: The Poetry of Yang Mu and Lo Ch'ing (translated by Joseph R. Allen, Seattle: University of Washington Press, 1993) and Hawk of the Mind: Collected Poems (edited by Michelle Yeh, New York: Columbia University Press, 2018) are three of his poetry collections available in English. He was the first poet and the first Taiwanese winning Newman Prize for Chinese Literature in the U.S. and the first Taiwanese awarded Cikada Prize in Sweden.

Yang was also a translator of Sir Gawain and the Green Knight, William Shakespeare's Tempest, W. B. Yeats's poetry, amongst others, into modern Chinese.

== Legacy ==
In recognition of his esteemed position in literature, The Yang Mu Literary Award and Literature Lecture Series of the NDHU College of Humanities and Social Sciences is named after him.

With the funding from Tzu-Hsien Tung, he donated his personal library from University of Washington and Academia Sinica to establish Yang Mu Library, which is regarded as the world's center of "Yang Mu Studies" within National Dong Hwa University.

== Awards ==
Year	Award
1971	Shi Zong Award (詩宗獎)
1979,1987	China Times Prize for Literature (時報文學獎)
1990	Wu Sanlian Literary Award (吳三連文學獎)
1996–2001	Award from the Foundation for the Advancement of Outstanding Scholarship (財團法人傑出人才發展基金會講座)
2000	National Culture and Arts Award (國家文藝獎)
2007	Huazong International Chinese Literature Award (花蹤世界華文文學獎)
2013	Newman Prize for Chinese Literature (紐曼華語文學獎)
2016	Cikada Prize (瑞典蟬獎)

== See also ==
- Xi Murong
- Hualing Nieh Engle
