= Chinese Psychological Society =

Academic organization in China

The Chinese Psychological Society is a non-profit academic organization, established by a group of psychologists in China. It was founded in 1921 and it is one of the earliest established national organizations in China, aiming at uniting all the psychologists to work and promote in the field of psychology.

== Functions ==
- Organizing academic exchanges between different countries and holding academic meetings.
- Studying psychological subjects.
- Popularizing basic theories in this field and propagating the spirits, ideas and methods of science.
- Compiling and publishing psychological magazines.
- Holding tutorial classes.
- Awarding the membership to major contributors in psychological study.

== Organizational structure ==
Chinese Psychological Society contains studies in every branch of psychology. The total number of membership is nearly 9000. There are local Psychological Societies in 31 provinces and provincial districts.

It publishes the journals Psychological Science and Acta Psychologica Sinica.
