= National Dong Hwa University Graduate Institute of Marine Biology =

- 國立東華大學環境暨海洋學院 海洋生物研究所
- Seal of NDHU Graduate Institute of Marine Biology
- Former names: Graduate Institute of Marine Biotechnology; Graduate Institute of Marine Biodiversity and Evolution
- Type: National Research institute
- Established: August 31, 2005 (20 years ago)
- Parent institution: National Dong Hwa University; National Museum of Marine Biology and Aquarium
- Director: Hsieh, Hung-Yen, PhD
- Location: Checheng, Pingtung, Taiwan; 22.0462266°N 120.6991344°E
- Website: IMB.NDHU.edu.tw

NDHU Graduate Institute of Marine Biology (Chinese: 國立東華大學海洋生物研究所, abbreviated NDHU IMB) was established in 2005. Originally known as the National Dong Hwa University College of Marine Sciences, it is located in Kenting National Park, Taiwan, and was Taiwan's first partnership model between university and museum. NDHU IMB was co-founded by National Dong Hwa University (NDHU) and National Museum of Marine Biology and Aquarium (NMMBA), and is part of NDHU College of Environmental Studies and Oceanography, operating as an independent research institute in the field of oceanography. It offers MS in Marine Biotechnology (MBT) and Marine Biodiversity and Evolution (MBE) and PhD in Marine Biology.

== History ==
=== NDHU College of Marine Sciences ===
NDHU College of Marine Sciences originated from the university's founding proposal, which included plans to establish a college of marine sciences. Similar collaborations between prestigious schools and museums abroad, such as United States's University of California, San Diego with Scripps Institution of Oceanography (SIO), France's University of Paris with Paris Museum of Natural History (MNHN), and UK's University of Bristol with Natural History Museum, London (NHM), have been successful in nurturing graduate's research talent. The National Museum of Marine Biology and Aquarium has also built a substantial capacity for scientific research and social education reputation since its establishment. Therefore, NDHU College of Marine Sciences was founded under the promotion by the 2nd President of National Dong Hwa University, Wen-Shu Hwang, and Founding Director of National Museum of Marine Biology and Aquarium, Lee-Shing Fang.

In 2004, National Dong Hwa University and National Museum of Marine Biology and Aquarium formally signed a partnership agreement, establishing the NDHU College of Marine Sciences at the newly established National Dong Hwa University Pingtung Campus (within NMMBA). This 'independent establishment, cooperative education' model was the first of its kind in Taiwan. The campus originally housed two institutes: Graduate Institute of Marine Biotechnology and Graduate Institute of Marine Biodiversity and Evolution. In 2014, these two institutes were merged into a single Graduate Institute of Marine Biology, with divisions for Marine Biotechnology (MBT) and Marine Biodiversity and Evolution (MBE). In 2017, NDHU IMB launched a Ph.D. program in Marine Biology.

=== NDHU College of Environmental Studies and Oceanography ===
In 2022, NDHU College of Environmental Studies and Oceanography (NDHU CESO) was established through integrating NDHU College of Marine Sciences and NDHU College of Environmental Studies in response to the global trend of interdisciplinary integration in sustainable development involving environmental studies and oceanography. NDHU Graduate Institute of Marine Biology became an independent research institute under NDHU CESO. In 2023, Pei-Jie Meng, Vice Dean of NDHU College of Environmental Studies and Oceanography, took over as Director of Taiwan Ocean Research Institute (TORI).

== Academics ==
- NDHU Graduate Institute of Marine Biology Rankings

Global
SCImago Aquatic Sciences	312 (2024)
RUR Medical Science	403 (2024)

National
SCImago Aquatic Sciences	3 (2024)
RUR Medical Science	5 (2024)

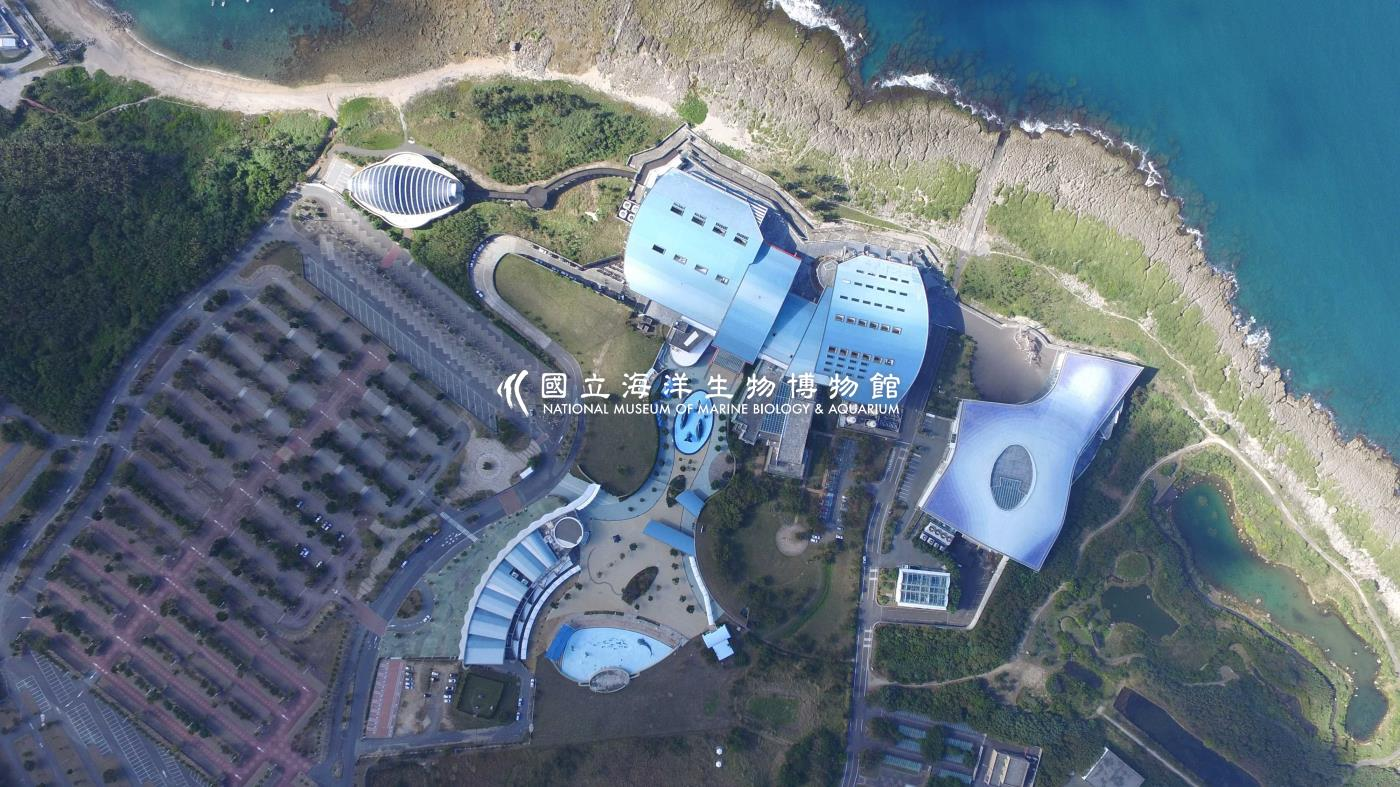
Environment and facilities of NDHU Graduate Institute of Marine Biology

The NDHU Graduate Institute of Marine Biology (IMB) originally consisting of the Marine Biotechnology Institute and the Marine Biodiversity and Evolution Institute in 2005, later merged into Graduate Institute of Marine Biology. NDHU IMB is Located in Checheng Township, Pingtung County, within National Museum of Marine Biology and Aquarium, and situated in Kenting National Park, where is the resource-rich marine environment surrounded by coral reefs and diverse tropical marine life, NMMBA provides academic research facilities and doctoral level faculty, allowing students to directly utilize these resources for research and learning.

=== Research Themes ===
- Coral Reef Species Breeding and Aquaculture
- Cellular and Molecular Biology of Coral-Dinoflagellate Endosymbiosis
- Integration of Ecological Conservation and Education of Coral Reefs
- Environmental Sciences and Aquarium Animal Research
- Marine Natural Products
- Marine Biodiversity

=== Graduate programs ===
==== M.S. in Marine Biotechnology ====
The MS program in Marine Biotechnology at NDHU IMB requiring 26 credits including 12 mandatory credits, 14 elective professional credits, and an academic thesis.

==== M.S. in Marine Biodiversity and Evolutionary Biology ====
The MS program in Marine Biodiversity and Evolutionary Biology at NDHU IMB requiring 26 credits including 13 mandatory credits, 13 elective professional credits, and an academic thesis.

==== Ph.D. Program in Marine Biology ====
The PhD program in Marine Biology at NDHU IMB requires 30 credits, including 25 mandatory professional credits, 5 elective professional credits, and academic thesis.

=== Facilities ===
RV Jiangshu (Chinese: 絳樹號海洋研究船) is Taiwan's first vassel dedicated to Marine Research, which was launched in 2023 by National Museum of Marine Biology and Aquarium. NDHU IMB leverage its Remotely operated underwater vehicle (ROV) capability to achieve research at a maximum depth of 500 meters underwater.

== Publications ==
=== Academic Journal ===
- Platax: Published by National Museum of Marine Biology and Aquarium

=== Books ===
- Drifters of the Sea
- Fish Atlas of Southern Taiwan (Volume One)
- Fish Atlas of Southern Taiwan (Volume Two)
- Peninsula Crabs 2.0
- Sea Slugs of Taiwan
- The Truth About Seafood
