= Master of Information Management =

Interdisciplinary degree program

A Master of Information Management (MIM) is an interdisciplinary degree program designed to provide studies in strategic information management, knowledge management, usability, business administration, information systems, information architecture, information design, computer sciences, policy, ethics, and project management. The degree is relatively new and has typically been developed alongside other, more established programs in university Schools of Information. The MIM degree has emerged to address the growing and unique need for information professionals who understand the conflux of multiple organizational issues across several disciplines.

The MIM degree is distinguished from closely related degrees (for example, Master of Science in Information System Management, Master of Information System Management, Master of Information Systems) that provide focused areas of study in computer science, information technology, information science, telecommunications, or some combination of these.

== History ==
The first MIM Programme in New Zealand was started in 2002 at Victoria University of Wellington. The first MIM degree program in the United States began in the fall of 2003 at The University of Maryland. Canada's first MIM program was established in Spring 2008.

== MIM Programs ==
=== United States ===
- Arizona State University
- Missouri Western State University
- Syracuse University School of Information Studies
- UIUC Graduate School of Library and Information Science
- University of Maryland College of Information Studies: Master of Information Management
- University of Michigan School of Information
- University of Washington Information School
- Washington University School of Engineering

=== Canada ===
- Dalhousie University

=== Colombia ===
- Escuela colombiana de ingeniería Julio Garavito

=== New Zealand ===
- Victoria University of Wellington

=== Australia ===
- RMIT University

=== United Kingdom ===
- The Information School at The University of Sheffield
- London School of Economics and Political Science

=== Belgium ===
- Katholieke Universiteit Leuven

=== Czech Republic ===
- Brno University of Technology

=== The Netherlands ===
- Tilburg University
- Maastricht University

=== Denmark ===
- Copenhagen Business School

=== India ===
- University of Mumbai
- Jamnalal Bajaj Institute of Management Studies, Mumbai
- MET (Mumbai Educational Trust) Institute of Management Studies, Bandra, Mumbai
- Welingkar Institute of Management Studies, Mumbai
- K.J. Somaiya Institute of Management Studies, Mumbai
- IES Institute of Management Studies, Mumbai
- Thakur Institute of Management Studies and Research, Mumbai
- Aditya Institute of Management Studies And Research, Mumbai

=== Philippines ===
- University of the East
- Colegio de San Juan de Letran-Calamba (Master in Management-Information Technology Management)

=== Poland ===
- Jagiellonian University (Master in Information Management)

=== Portugal ===
- NOVA University Lisbon (NOVA IMS - NOVA Information Management School)

=== Spain ===
- Universidad de Murcia

=== Iceland ===
- Reykjavík University

=== Taiwan ===
- National Dong Hwa University School of Management
- National Taiwan University of Science and Technology
- National Chiayi University

== Curriculum ==
The University of Maryland College of Information Studies describes the MIM degree as a focus "on ways information and technology can be best organized, implemented and managed to meet the needs of end users in a variety of business, legal, nonprofit, government and institutional settings, which are affected by changes in the global environment every day."

Curriculum will vary from school to school.

At the University of Maryland, MIM students can specialize, earning a degree with a concentration of Strategic Management of Information Concentration or Technology Development and Deployment (formerly Socio-Tech Information Systems). The Strategic Management of Information is intended for those students who want to become organizations’ chief information officers, or follow that general management path. Technology Development and Deployment is designed for students who want to follow technology director career paths.

== See also ==
- List of I-Schools
- Applied Information Management
