= NDHU School of Management =

Business School of National Dong Hwa University (NDHU)

Coordinates: 23.8974°N 121.5404°E

National Dong Hwa University School of Management
- 國立東華大學管理學院
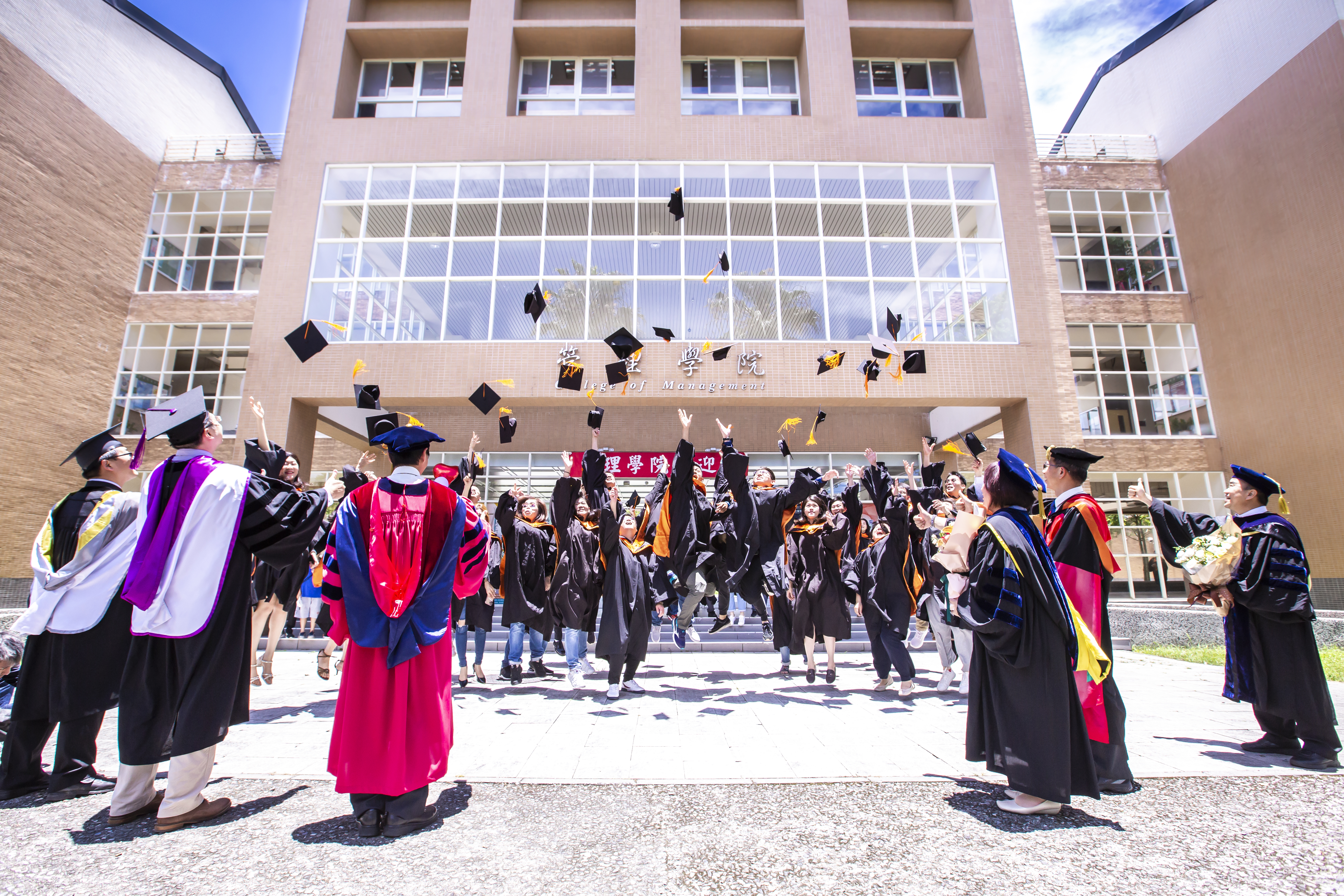
- NDHU School of Management Building
- Other name: NDHU School of Management (東華管理學院 )
- Motto: "From the East to the Great"
- Type: National Business School
- Established: August 1, 1995 (31 years ago)
- Parent institution: National Dong Hwa University
- Dean: Hsu Fang-Ming, Ph.D.
- Faculty: 68 (Fall 2024)
- Students: 1,898 (Fall 2020)
- Undergraduates: 1,477 (Fall 2020)
- Postgraduates: 421 (Fall 2020)
- Doctoral students: 64 (Fall 2020)
- Location: Shoufeng, Hualien, Taiwan
- Campus: Shoufeng Campus
- Colours: Blue
- Website: Management.NDHU.edu.tw

Chinese name
- Traditional Chinese: 國立東華大學管理學院
- Simplified Chinese: 国立东华大学管理学院
Transcriptions
Standard Mandarin
- Hanyu Pinyin: Guólì Dōnghuá Dàxué Guǎnlǐ Xuéyuàn
- Bopomofo: ㄍㄨㄛˊ ㄌㄧˋ ㄉㄨㄥ ㄏㄨㄚˊ ㄉㄚˋ ㄒㄩㄝˊ ㄍㄨㄢˇ ㄌㄧˇ ㄒㄩㄝˊ ㄩㄢˋ
Southern Min
- Tâi-lô: Kok-li̍p Tong-huâ Tāi-ha̍k kuán-lí Ha̍k-īnn

NDHU School of Management (also known as NDHU SOM; Chinese: 國立東華大學管理學院; pinyin: Dōnghuá Guǎnlǐ Xuéyuàn) is Taiwan's leading business school at National Dong Hwa University (NDHU), a national research university in Hualien, Taiwan. Established in 1995, the school offers undergraduate and graduate programs in business, accounting, and finance. Degree programs include MSc, MIM, MBA, and PhD programs, as well as dual degree programs with other international universities.

NDHU SOM conducts research and provides education in strategic management, operations management, marketing, information management, international business, finance, accounting, and tourism & recreation management. It is recognized for its consistently high global rankings in tourism and recreation and leisure studies.

== History ==
=== Foundation ===
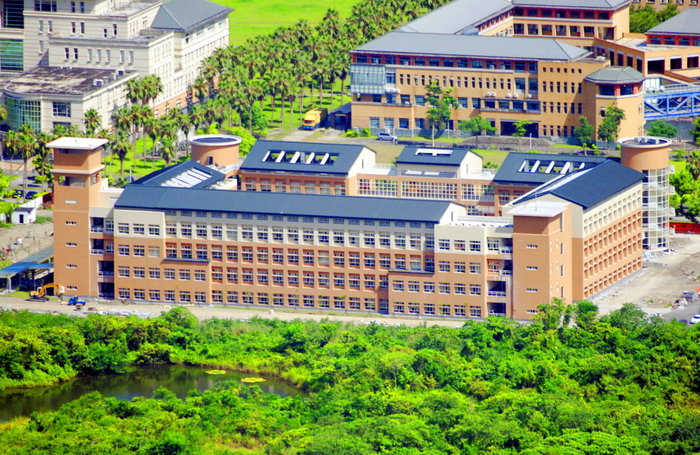
The overview of NDHU School of Management Building

NDHU School of Management traced its root back to Graduate Institute of Business Administration (BA) and Graduate Institute of Natural Resources Management (NRM) in 1994, with Lee Shao-Ju, Chair of Management Science at California State University, Northridge, as Founding Dean.

In 1996, NDHU SOM founded Graduate Institute of International Business (IB), with Cheng Chih-Ming, Professor of Economics at Georgia Institute of Technology, as Founding Director. In 1998, the school establish Department of Accounting (ACC), with Chang Young-Hang, Professor of Accountancy at North Dakota State University.

Following rapid growth in Natural Resources Management, the school expanded to established Graduate Institute of Tourism and Recreation Management (TRM) and Graduate Institute of Environmental Policy (EP) in 1999.

In 2001, NDHU School of Management expanded its academic field into In Management Information System and E-commerce, establishing Department of Information Management (IM) with Yang Wei-Pang, Chair of Information Science at National Chiao Tung University, as Founding Chair. Meanwhile, NDHU SOM establish the 1st PhD in Business Administration program in Eastern Taiwan and was in partnership with University of Arizona to conduct research in Artificial Intelligence.

In 2002, NDHU SOM established Department of Finance, with Ken Hung, Professor of Accounting and Finance at Morgan State University, as Founding Chair. NDHU Department of Finance later attracted many notable scholars to work there, such as Lin Jin-Lung, the board of directors at Central Bank of Taiwan, Wen Yin-Kann, the board of directors at Central Bank of Taiwan, and Wu Chung-Shu, chairman at Chung-Hua Institution for Economic Research.

=== Fast growth ===
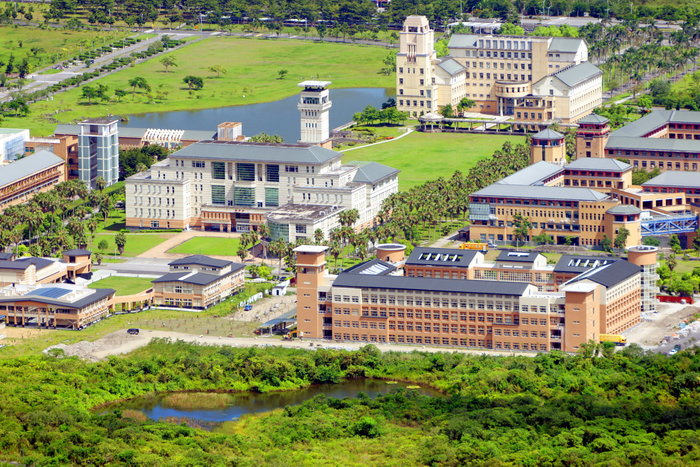
NDHU Campus View includes NDHU School of Management

In 2008, with merger of NDHU and NHUE, the Graduate Institute of Natural Resources Management and Graduate Institute of Environmental Policy were incorporated into newly established NDHU College of Environmental Studies. Meanwhile, NDHU SOM established Department of Tourism, Recreation, and Leisure Studies through merger of Graduate Institute of Tourism and Recreation Management and Department of Sport and Leisure Studies from NDHU College of Humanities and Social Sciences.

In 2010, NDHU SOM established the oldest three international MBA & MS programs among Taiwanese business schools, MBA in Business Administration, MBA in International Business, MS in finance. In 2011, NDHU School of Management offered International BBA in Management Science and Finance, which was one of Taiwan's oldest international BBA programs.

In 2022, NDHU School of Management was ranked among the world's Top 150 institutions in Hospitality & Tourism Management jointly with NDHU College of Environmental Studies (Ecotourism) and NDHU College of Indigenous Studies (Indigenous Tourism) by Academic Ranking of World Universities (ARWU).

In 2023, NDHU SOM established International BBA in Accounting and Information Management, was NDHU SOM's 2nd international BBA program. In 2024, it established International BBA in Digital Marketing and Service Innovation, was the 3rd international BBA program of the school.

The establishment of NDHU School of Management set many records in Taiwan. It was the first business school in Eastern Taiwan and the first institution in Taiwan to award MBA Logistics Management, MSc Natural Resources Management, MSc Environmental Policy, MBA Tourism and Recreation Management, and PhD Natural Resources and Environmental Studies.

== Academic programs ==
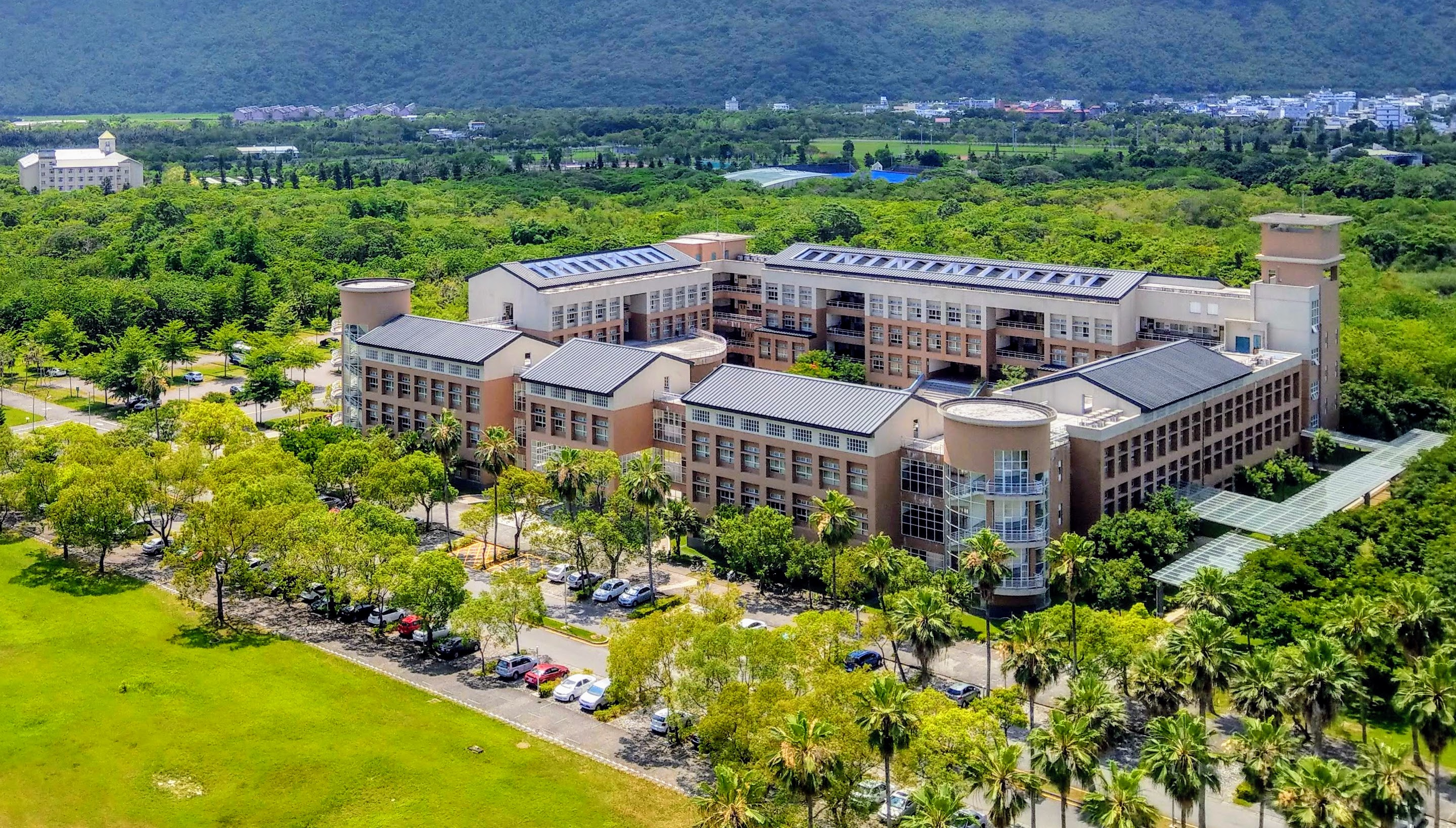
NDHU School of Management Building

=== Graduate ===
==== Doctor of Philosophy (PhD) ====
The doctoral program (PhD) at NDHU School of Management is a full-time, in-residence program intended for students who plan scholarly careers involving research and teaching in management. There are seven major tracks for PhD students follow at NDHU School of Management:

- Business Administration
  - Concentration in Marketing Management
  - Concentration in Strategic Management and Human Resource Management
  - Concentration in Operation Management and Management Science
- International Business
- Logistics Management
- Information Management
- Accounting
- Finance
- Tourism and Recreation Management

==== Master of Business Administration (MBA) ====
There are 3 specialization MBA programs students can choose from:

- MBA in Business Administration
- MBA in International Business
- MBA in Logistics Management

==== Master of Science (MS) ====
There are 3 specialization M.S. programs students can choose from:

- MSc in Finance
- MSc in Accounting
- MSc in Tourism, Recreation and Leisure Studies

==== Master of Information Management (MIM) ====
The NDHU Master of Information Management (MIM) program is designed to provide students with knowledge and skills in information systems, knowledge management, big data, e-commerce, cybersecurity and related technologies. The program integrates theoretical foundations in information management with practical applications relevant to industry and organizational settings.

==== Executive MBA (EMBA) ====
The NDHU School of Management also offers "NDHU EMBA" for those who have already reached a senior level in their organisations or professions, and are seeking to study part-time while maintaining their current role.

The school also offers an Entrepreneurship and Innovation MBA (EiMBA) for those aiming to advance their capabilities in entrepreneurship, innovation, and action in changes.

=== Undergraduate ===
==== Bachelor of Business Administration (BBA) ====
NDHU School of Management offers nine programs in different majors.

- Business Administration
- International Business
- Digital Marketing and Service Innovation
- Information Management
- Finance
- Accounting
- Management Science and Finance
- Accounting and Information Management
- Tourism, Recreation, and Leisure Studies

These programs operate on a modular system where students design their curricula to pace their studies. They may also take modules of their interest, subject to any prerequisite requirements and to the availability of modules.

=== Dual degree ===
The NDHU School of Management offers dual degree in partnership with universities across Asia, Europe, Australia, and North America:

==== North America ====
- UTA College of Business, University of Texas at Arlington, United States
- Lam Family School of Business, San Francisco State University, United States

==== Oceania ====
- UTS Business School, University of Technology Sydney, Australia
- Griffith Business School (GBS), Griffith University, Australia

==== Europe ====
- ESC Rennes School of Business, France
- MDX Business School, Middlesex University London, United Kingdom
- Faculty of Business Studies, FH Aachen, Germany

==== Asia ====
- International Graduate School of Accounting Policy (IGSAP), Tohoku University, Japan
- Graduate School of Economics (GSE), Nagasaki University, Japan

== Academics ==
=== Ranking and reputation ===
- National Dong Hwa University School of Management Rankings

Global Ranking
ARWU Hospitality & Tourism Management	101-150 (2021)
QS Hospitality & Leisure Management	51-100 (2026)
QS Social Sciences and Management‌	501-550 (2025)
EduRank Real Estate	384 (2021)

National Ranking
ARWU Hospitality & Tourism Management	4 (2021)
QS Hospitality & Leisure Management'	2 (2026)
QS Social Sciences and Management‌	9 (2025)
EduRank Real Estate	2 (2021)

The NDHU School of Management strengths in both academics and research are reflected in its rankings and other accolades.

In 2026, NDHU SOM was ranked 2nd in Taiwan (14th in Asia and 51-100th in the world) for Hospitality & Leisure Management program by QS World University Rankings by Subject, holding the equal statue with Purdue University, Virginia Tech, University of Massachusetts Amherst, Texas A&M University. In 2025, NDHU SOM was ranked 9th in Taiwan (147th in Asia) for Social Sciences & Management program by QS World University Rankings by Subject.

In 2021, ARWU Global Ranking of Academic Subjects ranked Hospitality & Tourism Management program in NDHU School of Management as Top 150 worldwide, holding the equal statue with Texas Tech University, Indiana University Bloomington, and University of Illinois at Urbana-Champaign.

NDHU SOM was ranked 2nd in Taiwan and 384th in the world for Real Estate by EduRank. NDHU was selected as "Key Bilingual College" (雙語重點學院) in "Program of Bilingual Education for Students in College" (大學雙語學習計畫) by Ministry of Education (MOE) to facilitate international learning and teaching, which was among 13 business schools selected in this program and the only one from Eastern Taiwan.

NDHU SOM is ranked Top 6 among schools in Humanities and Social Sciences, Law, and Business (文法商) by Global Views Monthly (遠見雜誌), which is placed No.4 among Taiwanese public schools. In 2010–2019, NDHU's Master of Science in Accounting program achieved 100% graduates received at least one offer from Big Four accounting firms for consecutive 9 years.

=== Departments/Graduate Institute ===
The NDHU School of Management offers programs at both the graduate and undergraduate levels, including Bachelor's degrees, Master's degree, and PhDs. Degrees are offered in the majors such as Business Administration, International Business, Information Management, Accounting, Finance, Logistics Management, and Tourism, Recreation and Leisure Studies.

- Department of Business Administration (B.B.A., M.B.A., Ph.D.)
- Department of International Business (B.B.A., M.B.A., Ph.D.)
- Department of Finance (B.F., M.S., Ph.D.)
- Department of Accounting (B.S., M.S., Ph.D.)
- Department of Information Management (B.B.A., M.I.M., Ph.D.)
- Department of Tourism, Recreation and Leisure Studies (B.S., M.S., Ph.D.)
- Graduate institute of Logistics Management (M.B.A., Ph.D.)

=== Research centers ===
The School is home to several research facilities, in the fields of Transportation Studies, FinTech Studies, Enterprise Resource Planning Studies, as well as New Economic Policy.

- East Center for Transportation Research & Development (ECTRD)
- FinTech Big Data Research Center (FBDRC)
- Finance.Innovation.Training Center (FITC)
- Sustainable Finance Research Center (SFRC)
- New Economic Policy Research Center (NEPRC)
- Enterprise Resource Planning Center (ERPC)

== Notable people ==
=== Notable alumni ===
- Liu Li Wei (BBA), Partner of Deloitte Touche Tohmatsu LTD.
- Chen Shao Liang (EMBA), President of Taiwan International Ports Corporation
- Wang Li-yu (MBA), Founder of Chatime, Taiwanese teahouse chain.
- Liu Yi Ru (BS), President of Second Floor Group Co., Taiwanese restaurant chain.
- Wang Ching-chi (MBA), President of Château Hotels & Resorts, former president of Farglory Hotel.
- Yoga Lin (BS), Taiwanese pop music singer.

=== Notable faculty ===
Notable present and past NDHU SOM faculty include:

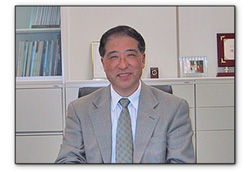
Chair of Management Science at California State University, Northridge Shao-Ju Lee

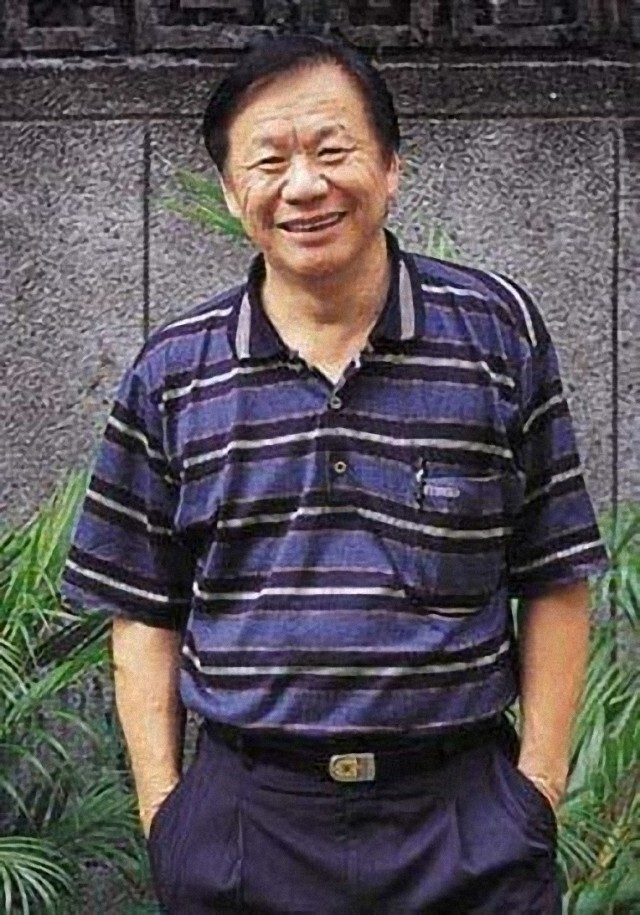
Founding Director of Taroko National Park Kuo-Shih Hsu

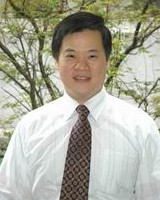
Chairman of Taiwan Institute of Economic Research and Chung-Hua Institution for Economic Research Chung-Shu Wu

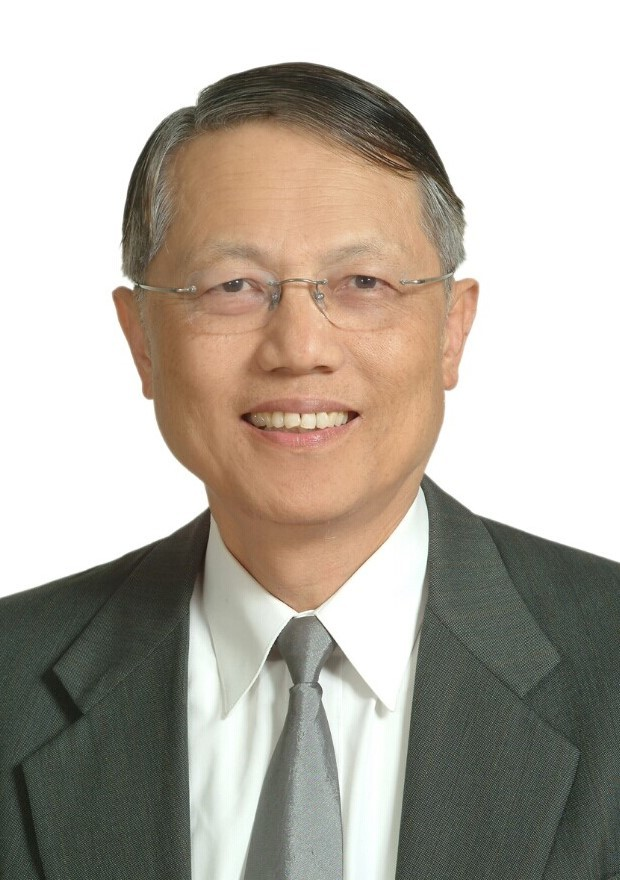
Board Director of Central Bank of the Republic of China (Taiwan) Yin-kann Wen

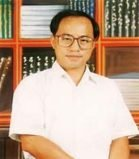
Board Director of Central Bank of the Republic of China (Taiwan) Jin-Lung Lin
