= Sichongxi Hot Spring =

Hot spring in Checheng, Pingtung County, Taiwan

- 四重溪溫泉
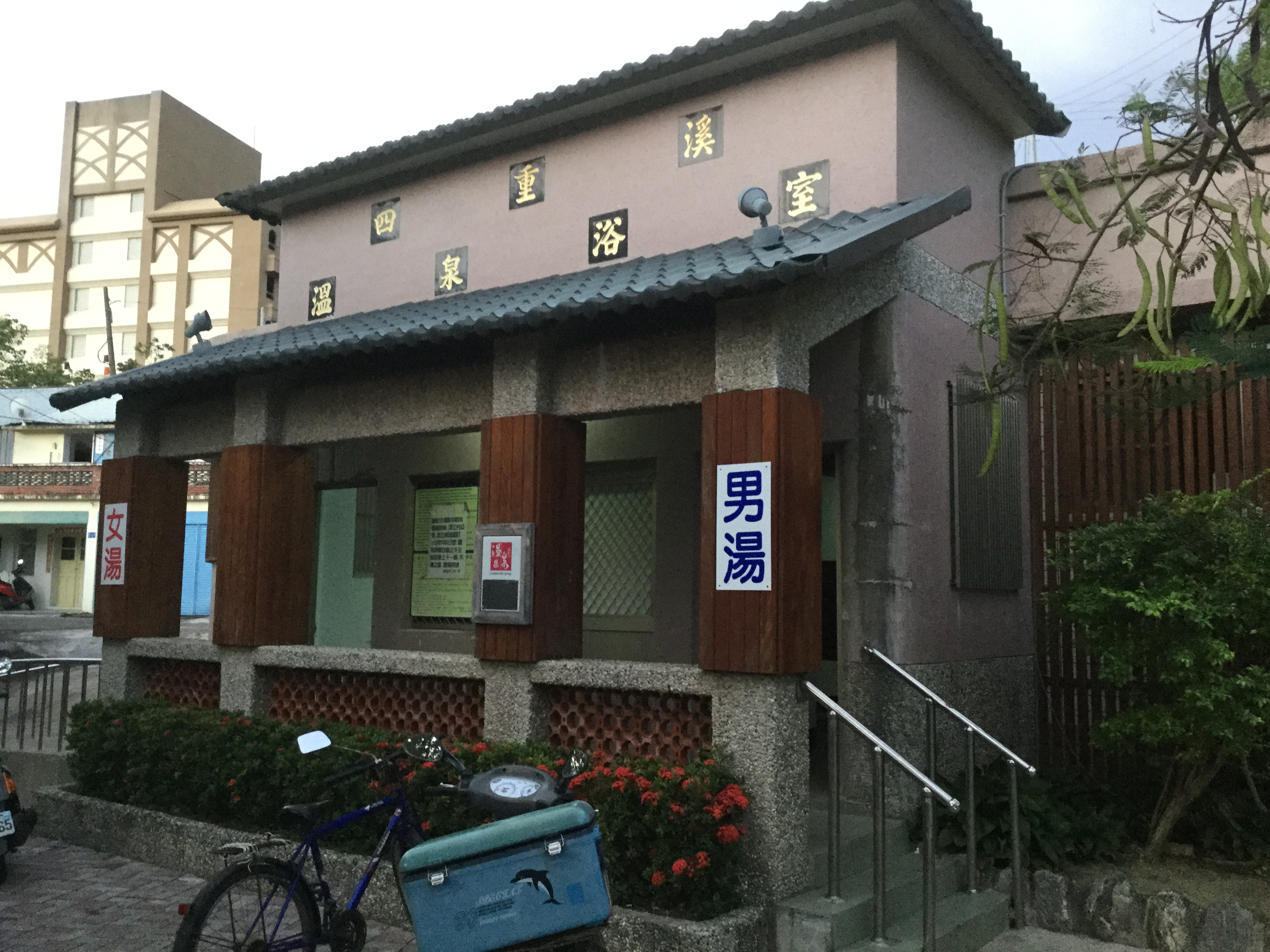

- Location within Pingtung County
- Interactive map of Sichongxi Hot Spring
- Location: Checheng, Pingtung County, Taiwan
- Coordinates: 22°05′43″N 120°44′45″E
- Type: hot spring

The Sichongxi Hot Spring (traditional Chinese: 四重溪溫泉; simplified Chinese: 四重溪温泉; pinyin: Sìchóngxī Wēnquán) is a hot spring in Checheng Township, Pingtung County, Taiwan.

== Geology ==
The hot spring is located at the Sichong riverbank. The hot spring water is of alkaline type and rich in sodium carbonate. The area around the hot spring was designed with Japanese architecture style.

== Transportation ==
The hot spring is accessible by bus from Pingtung Station of Taiwan Railway.

== See also ==
- List of tourist attractions in Taiwan
- Taiwanese hot springs
