= NDHU College of Environmental Studies and Oceanography =

School of National Dong Hwa University (NDHU)

- 國立東華大學環境暨海洋學院
- Seal of NDHU College of Environmental Studies and Oceanography
- Type: National (Public); Environmental Studies; Oceanography
- Established: August 1, 2009
- Parent institution: National Dong Hwa University
- Affiliations: Global Environmental Education Partnership Asia-Pacific Regional Center
- Dean: Tai Hsing-Sheng, PhD（戴興盛 院長）
- Academic staff: 45 (Fall 2024)
- Students: 347 (Fall 2023)
- Undergraduates: 221 (Fall 2023)
- Postgraduates: 126 (Fall 2023)
- Doctoral students: 34 (Fall 2023)
- Location: Shoufeng, Hualien, Taiwan
- Campus: Shoufeng Campus Pingtung Campus (National Museum of Marine Biology and Aquarium)
- Website: CES.NDHU.edu.tw

Chinese name
- Traditional Chinese: 國立東華大學環境暨海洋學院
- Simplified Chinese: 国立东华大学环境暨海洋学院
Transcriptions
Standard Mandarin
- Hanyu Pinyin: Guólì Dōnghuá Dàxué Huánjìng Jì Hǎiyáng Xuéyuàn
- Bopomofo: ㄍㄨㄛˊ ㄌㄧˋ ㄉㄨㄥ ㄏㄨㄚˊ ㄉㄚˋ ㄒㄩㄝˊ ㄏㄨㄢˊ ㄐㄧㄥˋ ㄐㄧˋ ㄏㄞˇ ㄧㄤˊ ㄒㄩㄝˊ ㄩㄢˋ
Southern Min
- Tâi-lô: Kok-li̍p Tang-huâ Tāi-ha̍k Khuân-kíng Kap Hái-iûnn Ha̍k-īnn

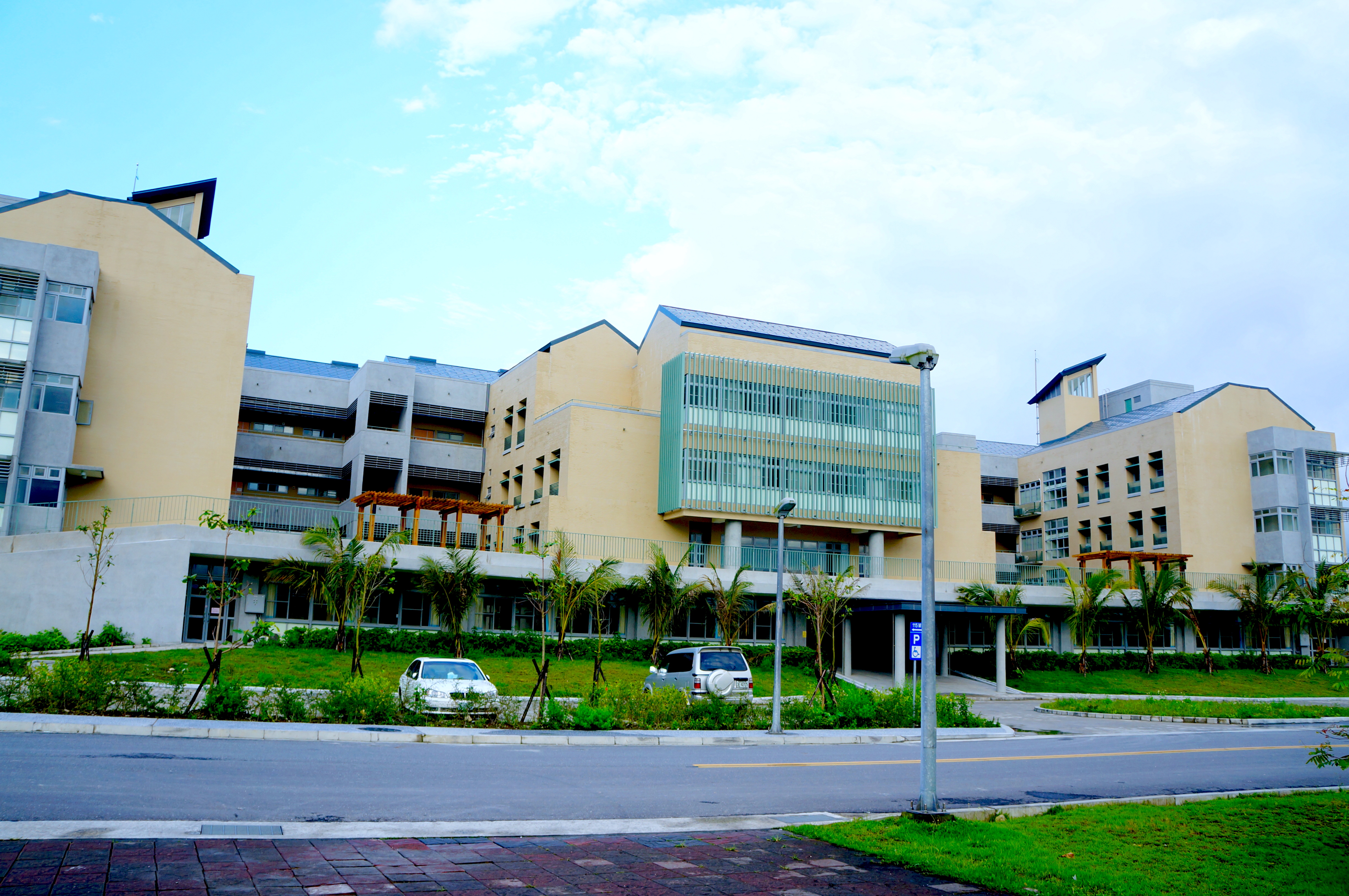
A view of NDHU College of Environmental Studies and Oceanography

NDHU College of Environmental Studies and Oceanography (NDHU CESO; Chinese: 國立東華大學環境暨海洋學院; pinyin: Dōnghuá Huánjìng Jì Hǎiyáng Xuéyuàn) is Taiwan's leading interdisciplinary school of Environmental Studies and Oceanography at National Dong Hwa University (NDHU). Founded in 2009, NDHU CESO is formed as Taiwan's first school for Environmental Studies through merger of Graduate Institute of Natural Resources Management, Graduate Institute of Environmental Policy, Graduate Institute of Ecological and Environmental Education, Graduate Institute of Earth Sciences, Graduate Institute of Marine Biology, and Graduate Institute of Biological Resources and Technology from National Dong Hwa University and National Hualien University of Education.

NDHU CESO offers Taiwan's first interdisciplinary MSc program for Humanity and Environmental Science through partnership with NDHU College of Humanities and Social Sciences and NDHU College of Indigenous Studies, and co-offer Future Earth Ecology Program with NTU and NTHU to nurture Taiwan's naturalist. NDHU CESO also has partnership with Nepal Ministry of Forests and Environment on environmental education training.

== History ==
=== Prior to foundation ===
==== Graduate Institute of Natural Resources Management (1994-2009) ====
NDHU Graduate Institute of Natural Resource Management (GINRM) was established in 1994 as NDHU's founding institute and is affiliated with NDHU School of Management. It was the pioneer in the field of natural resource management in Taiwan. GINRM was founded by Dr. Hsu Kuo-Shih, the Founding Director of Taroko National Park, with a focus on natural resource management and nature conservation. Following rapid growth in the academic field of natural resource tourism and Environmental governance, it branched out to establish the Graduate Institute of Environmental Policy (GIEP) and Graduate Institute of Tourism and Recreation Management (GITRM).

==== Graduate Institute of Environmental Policy (1999-2009) ====
NDHU Graduate Institute of Environmental Policy (GIEP) was established in 1999. It was founded by Dr.Wang Hurng-Jyuhn, a Taiwan's scholar in environmental policy, and was Taiwan's first institute dedicated to environmental policy research. Its main focuses are environmental policy, environmental management, and sustainable development strategies, and Environmental governance between human societies and ecological environments.

=== Foundation ===
==== College of Environmental Studies (2009-2022) ====
With merger of National Dong Hwa University and National Hualien University of Education, NDHU College of Environmental Studies (CES) and Department of Natural Resource and Environmental Studies (NRES) was founded in 2009 through merger of Graduate Institute of Natural Resources Management, Graduate Institute of Environmental Policy, Graduate Institute of Ecological and Environmental Education, Graduate Institute of Earth Sciences, and Graduate Institute of Biological Resources and Technology from both university.

==== College of Marine Sciences (2005-2022) ====
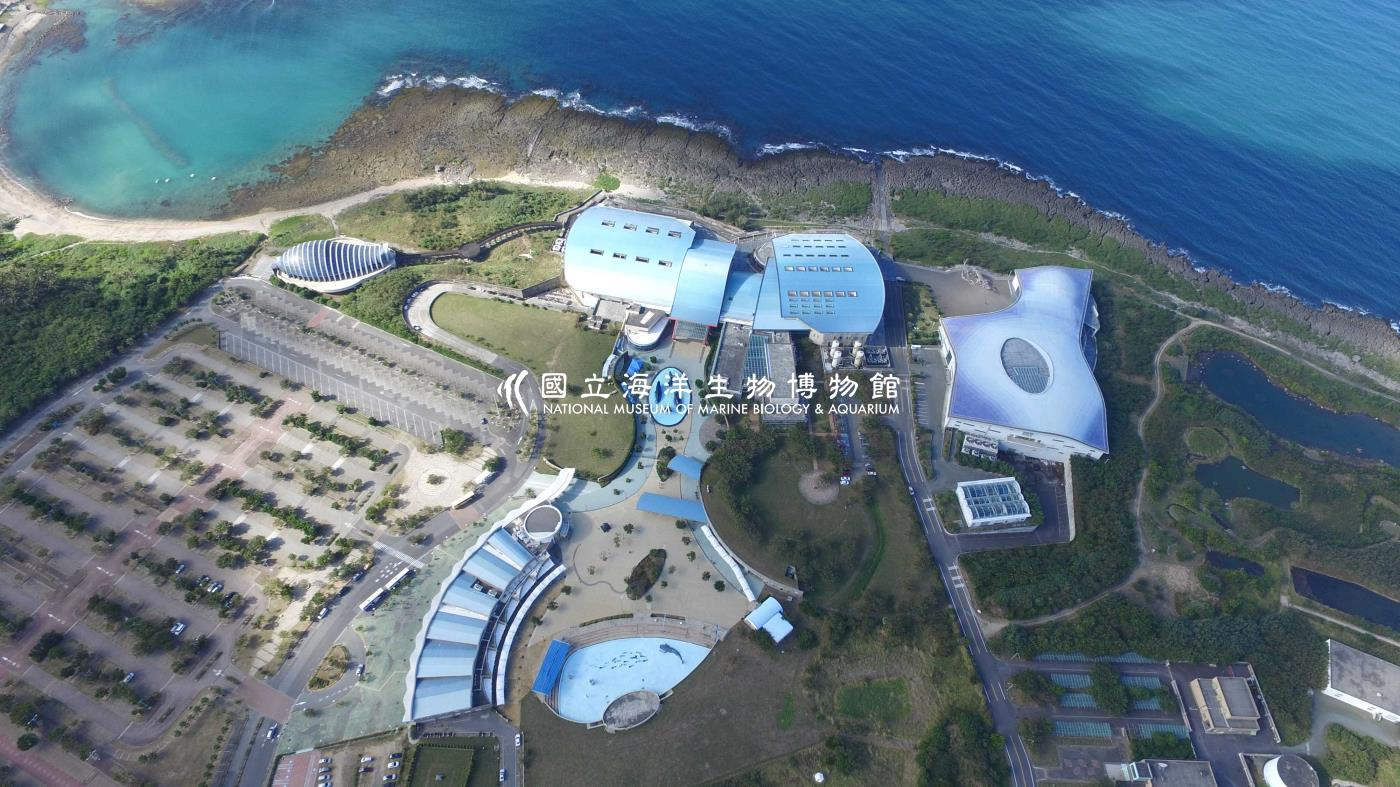
NDHU CESO's Graduate Institute of Marine Biology is based in Kenting National Park

NDHU College of Marine Sciences (CMS) was established in 2005 as a graduate school for Marine Sciences and Marine Biology. NDHU CMS was an academic partnership between National Dong Hwa University and National Museum of Marine Biology and Aquarium (NMMBA) in Kenting National Park, which set the first record on academic collaboration between higher education and museum in Taiwan. Meanwhile, it founded Graduate Institute of Marine Biodiversity and Evolutionary Biology and Graduate Institute of Marine Biotechnology to leverage research resources from NMMBA.

=== Nowaday ===
With interdisciplinary trend of sustainability studies for Environmental Studies and Oceanography, NDHU College of Environmental Studies and Oceanography was established through merger of NDHU College of Environmental Studies and College of Marine Sciences in 2022.

== Academic ==
=== Ranking ===
- NDHU College of Environmental Studies and Oceanography Rankings

Global Ranking
THE Geology	A− (2022)
THE Ecology	A− (2022)
THE Environment Science and Engineering	A− (2022)
SCImage Aquatic Science	312 (2024)
SCImage Animal Science and Zoology	640 (2024)

National Ranking
THE Geology	4 (2022)
THE Ecology	4 (2022)
THE Environment Science and Engineering	3 (2022)
SCImage Aquatic Science	3 (2024)
SCImage Animal Science and Zoology	7 (2024)

According to Times Higher Education World University Ranking by Subject, NDHU CESO is ranked A- level in the world for Geology (4th in Taiwan), Ecology (4th in Taiwan), and Environment Science and Engineering (3rd in Taiwan).

The SCImago ranked NDHU CESO 3rd in Taiwan for Aquatic Science, 7th in Taiwan for Animal Science and Zoology. The Research.com ranked it 2nd in Taiwan for Ecology and Evolution.

=== Department and Graduate Institute ===
- Department of Natural Resource and Environmental Studies
- Graduate Institute of Marine Biology

=== Research centers ===
==== Center for Interdisciplinary Research on Ecology and Sustainability (CIRES) ====
The Center for Interdisciplinary Research on Ecology and Sustainability (CIRES) was established in 2020. CIRES aims to become a Asia's regional center platform for scientific exchange and collaborative research to promote resilience studies in social-ecological systems, advance the governance of social-ecological systems, and thereby address the increasingly severe environmental, social, and economic issues under the impact of global change.

==== Eastern Taiwan Earthquake Research Center (E-TEC) ====
With Support from National Science and Technology Council, NDHU Eastern Taiwan Earthquake Research Center was established through a collaborative effort of several academic institutions, including NDHU CESO, Central Weather Bureau, Academia Sinica Institute of Earth Sciences, National Center for Research on Earthquake Engineering, Central Geological Survey, National Taiwan University, National Cheng Kung University, and National Central University. NDHU E-TEC serves as an integrated platform and a vital research hub for earthquake studies in eastern Taiwan.

With its distinguished location on the continental collision between Philippine Sea Plate and Eurasian Plate in eastern Taiwan, making NDHU E-TEC an optimal natural laboratory for earthquake research. Particularly, the Huadong Valley, situated in the plate collision and subduction transition zone, is the region with the highest earthquake frequency in Taiwan. The establishment of NDHU E-TEC, in collaboration with national research resources and NDHU CESO, enables more precise observation and analysis of eastern Taiwan's geophysical structures, assesses potential major earthquake threats, and plays a crucial role in Taiwan's earthquake early warning, data integration, precursory research, and disaster prevention applications.

==== Taiwan Long-Term Socio-Ecological Research (LTSER) ====
Taiwan Long-Term Socio-Ecological Research (TLTSER) is an essential initiative addressing the interaction and evolution of social-ecological systems over time. These systems, comprising intertwined and evolving ecosystems and social structures, develop unique characteristics and dynamics through prolonged interactions. Understanding these interactions is crucial for constructing and managing social-ecological systems effectively. In Taiwan, the transformation triggered by extensive social-ecological changes and governmental policies poses numerous challenges to rural areas, including demographic shifts, land use changes, and local economic struggles, alongside the broader impacts of climate change policies like the "2050 zero carbon emission" goal.

The TLTSER focuses on study sites in Eastern Taiwan, specifically the Fenling District and Guangfu Township. Fenling, representing a typical rural socio-ecological system, is predominantly agricultural and exemplifies the broader trends affecting similar areas across Taiwan, such as shifts in land use and economic makeup. A notable change is the conversion of artificial forests to ground-mounted photovoltaic (PV) systems, with extensive areas earmarked for future PV installations. The proximity of these developments to villages, farmland, and forests raises significant questions about their impacts on local climates, biodiversity, and community well-being.

By monitoring these changes across various stages of PV system implementation, the TLTSER aims to provide a detailed understanding of the alterations in land use and their implications. This research is pivotal for addressing local environmental and social issues, offering a scientific basis for informed public policy and governance, and contributing to sustainable development and environmental conservation in Taiwan.

== Academic programs ==
=== Graduate ===
==== Doctor of Philosophy (PhD) ====
The Doctoral program (PhD) at NDHU College of Environmental Studies and Oceanography is a full-time, in-residence program intended for students who plan scholarly careers involving research and teaching in Environmental Studies and Oceanography. There are two PhD programs:

- PhD in Natural Resources and Environmental Studies
- PhD in Marine Biology

==== Master of Science (MS) ====
Master of Science (MS) has four major tracks for MS students follow at NDHU College of Environmental Studies and Oceanography:

- MS in Natural Resources and Environmental Studies
  - Concentration in Ecology and Conservation
  - Concentration in Environmental Education and Ecotourism
  - Concentration in Environmental Management and Environmental Policy
  - Concentration in Earth Science
- MS in Humanity and Environmental Science
- MS in Marine Biodiversity and Evolutionary Biology
- MS in Marine Biotechnology

=== Undergraduate ===
NDHU College of Environmental Studies and Oceanography offers one program in different concentrations.

- Bachelor of Science (BS) in Natural Resources and Environmental Studies
  - Concentration in Ecology and Conservation
  - Concentration in Environmental Management and Environmental Education
  - Concentration in Earth Science

These programs operate on a modular system where students design their curricula to pace their studies. They may also take modules of their interest, subject to any prerequisite requirements and to the availability of modules.

=== Dual Degree ===
NDHU College of Environmental Studies and Oceanography offers Dual-PhD in partnership with Simon Fraser University in Canada.

== International Partnerships and Relations ==
NDHU College of Environmental Studies and Oceanography (NDHU CESO) has collaborative relationships with numerous higher education institutions and research institutes worldwide in the fields of environmental studies and oceanography, including University of California, San Diego Scripps Institution of Oceanography in USA, Oregon State University in USA, Marche Polytechnic University in Italy, Nausicaá Centre National de la Mer in France, University of Florida in USA, Simon Fraser University in Canada, Hokkaido University Faculty of Environmental Earth Science in Japan, Okayama University Faculty of Environmental Science and Technology in Japan, China University of Geosciences in Wuhan.

NDHU CESO also has long-term collaborations with Hokkaido University School of Environmental Earth Science, Zhejiang University College of Life Sciences, and China University of Geosciences in faculty and student exchanges, and fieldwork education.

Furthermore, NDHU CESO has signed cooperation agreements with Nepal Ministry of Forests and Environment and Wildlife Conservation Nepal Foundation to assist in training Nepalese environmental education personnel, making it the sole signing entity in Taiwan for Nepal.

In addition to academic exchanges, NDHU CESO hosts visits from Chinese University of Hong Kong Earth and Environmental Sciences Programme, University of Tokyo Earthquake Research Institute, Tohoku University International Research Institute of Disaster Science, Tokyo University of Science Department of Architecture, and German Research Centre for Geosciences (GFZ) to NDHU Eastern Taiwan Earthquake Center.
