= National Museum of Marine Biology and Aquarium =

Museum in Checheng, Pingtung County, Taiwan

- 國立海洋生物博物館
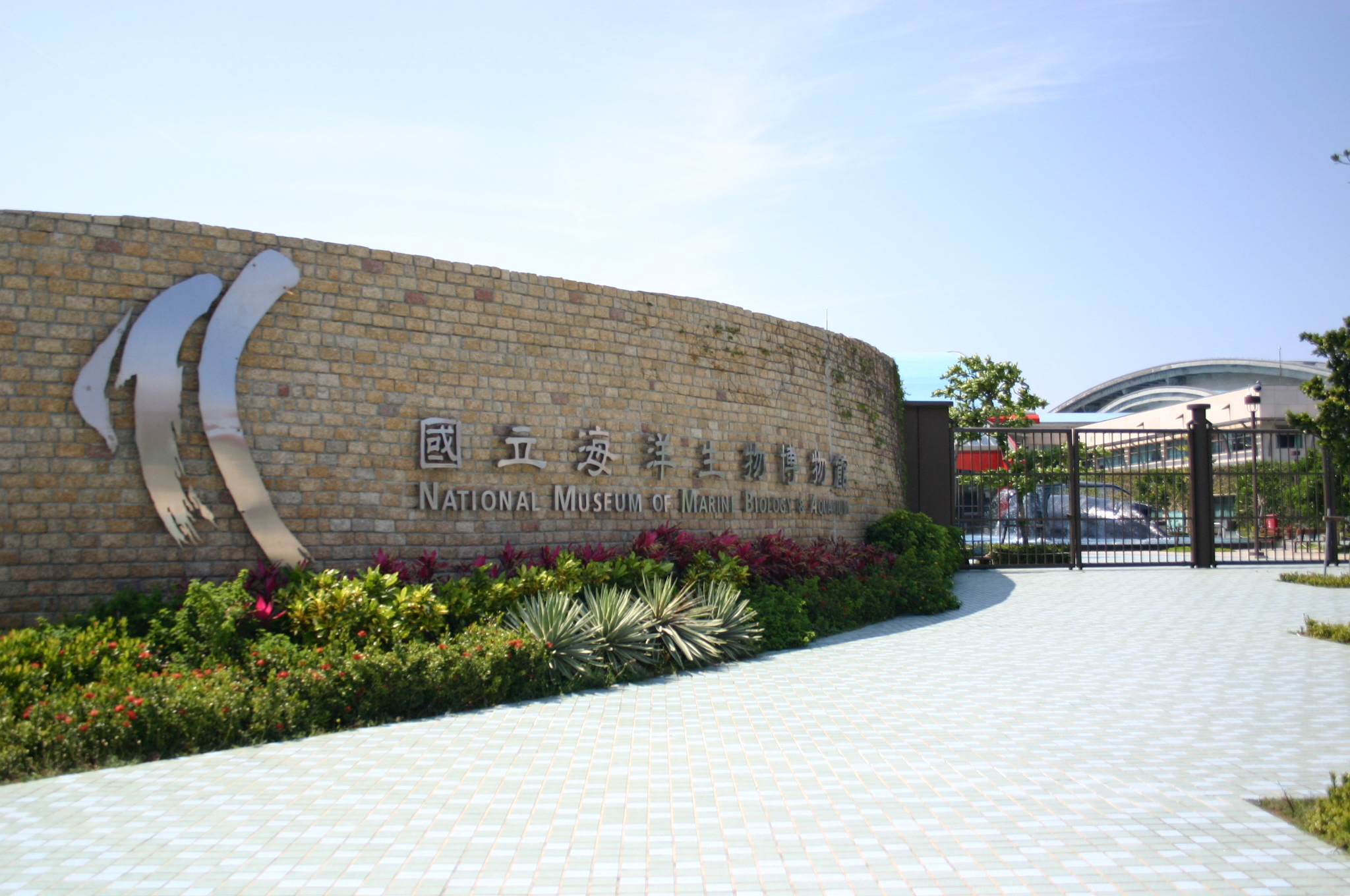
- Entrance to the museum
- Established: 25 February 2000
- Location: 2 Houwan Rd. Checheng, Pingtung County, Taiwan
- Coordinates: 22°02′47″N 120°41′52″E
- Collections: Waters of Taiwan; Coral Kingdom Pavilion; Waters of the World
- Visitors: 978,032 (2023)
- Website: www.nmmba.gov.tw
National Museum of Marine Biology and Aquarium
- Interactive map of National Museum of Marine Biology and Aquarium
- Land area: 35.81 hectares (358,100 m^{2})
- Volume of largest tank: 4,070,000 litres (1,075,000 US gal)
- Website: http://www.nmmba.gov.tw/english/index.aspx

The National Museum of Marine Biology and Aquarium (NMMBA; Chinese: 國立海洋生物博物館; pinyin: Guólì Hǎiyáng Shēngwù Bówùguǎn; Pe̍h-ōe-jī: Kok-li̍p Hái-iûⁿ Seng-bu̍t Phok-bu̍t-koán) is Taiwan's leading public aquarium, museum, and marine biology research institution, located in Kenting National Park, Checheng Township, Pingtung County.

In 2004, NMMBA cooperated with National Dong Hwa University to jointly establish NDHU College of Marine Sciences and Graduate Institute of Marine Biology, which was the first academic partnership between university and museum in Taiwan.

== Overview ==
Planning for the museum began in 1991, and the museum opened on 25 February 2000. In addition to the museum, the park surrounding the museum is an outdoor water park (the largest in Taiwan).

The total area of the park is 57.14 hectares (571,400 m^{2}), of which the museum occupies 35.81 hectares (358,100 m^{2}). The aquarium holds 24.14 million liters of seawater, including 15.53 million liters in exhibit tanks. About 600 species (12,000 individuals) are on display, while the off-exhibit husbandry and outdoor pools house approximately 160 species (30,000 individuals). The largest exhibit tank, the Main Coral tank, contains 4.07 million liters of seawater.

The museum features three main exhibition areas, Waters of Taiwan, Coral Kingdom Pavilion, and World Waters Pavilion, as well as an 82.5-meter underwater tunnel with a moving walkway, one of the largest in Asia. Additional facilities include the experiment center for aquatic life, public facilities, research facilities, maintenance facilities, an international conference center, and an academic research center.

== Exhibitions ==
The museum has three main exhibitions:

=== Waters of Taiwan ===
This exhibit hall features aquatic animals native to Taiwan, from waters as small as rivers to as vast as the open sea. The exhibits are themed after the water systems of Taiwan, starting from the river and the reservoir to the intertidal zone and finally to the open sea. There is also a touch pool featuring marine invertebrates in the intertidal exhibit area. Animals on display include tilapia, Japanese eel, trout, cuttlefish, nurse sharks, Indo-Pacific tarpon, yellowfin tuna, spotted eagle rays, and a whale shark. The main ocean tanks contains 3,800,000 litres (1,000,000 US gal) of sea water, has a 16.1 m × 4.1 m (53 ft × 13 ft) acrylic viewing window.

Waters of Taiwan

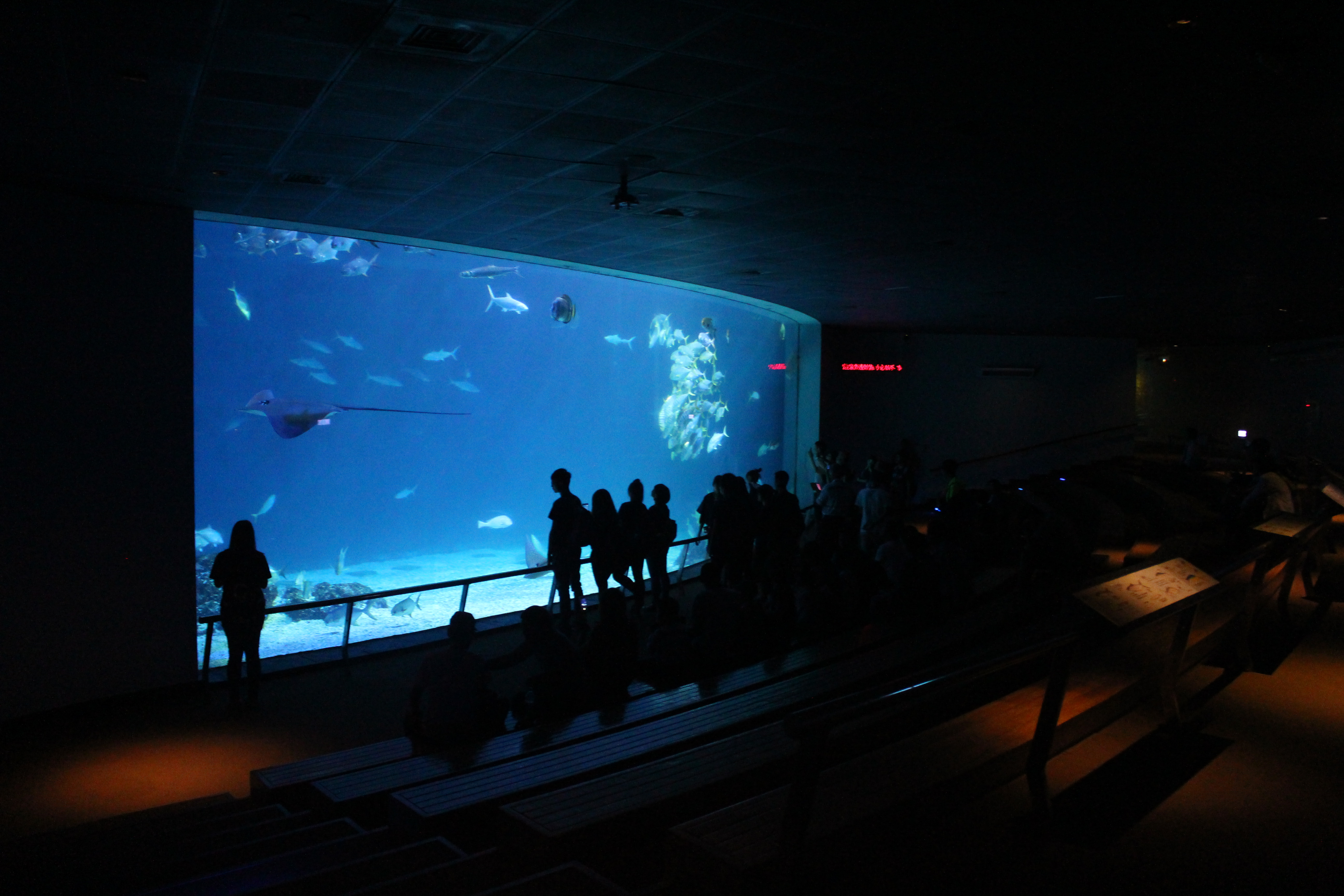
The Open Ocean Aquarium, featuring pelagic fishes from the waters surrounding Taiwan. A daily feeding presentation in the Open Ocean Aquarium

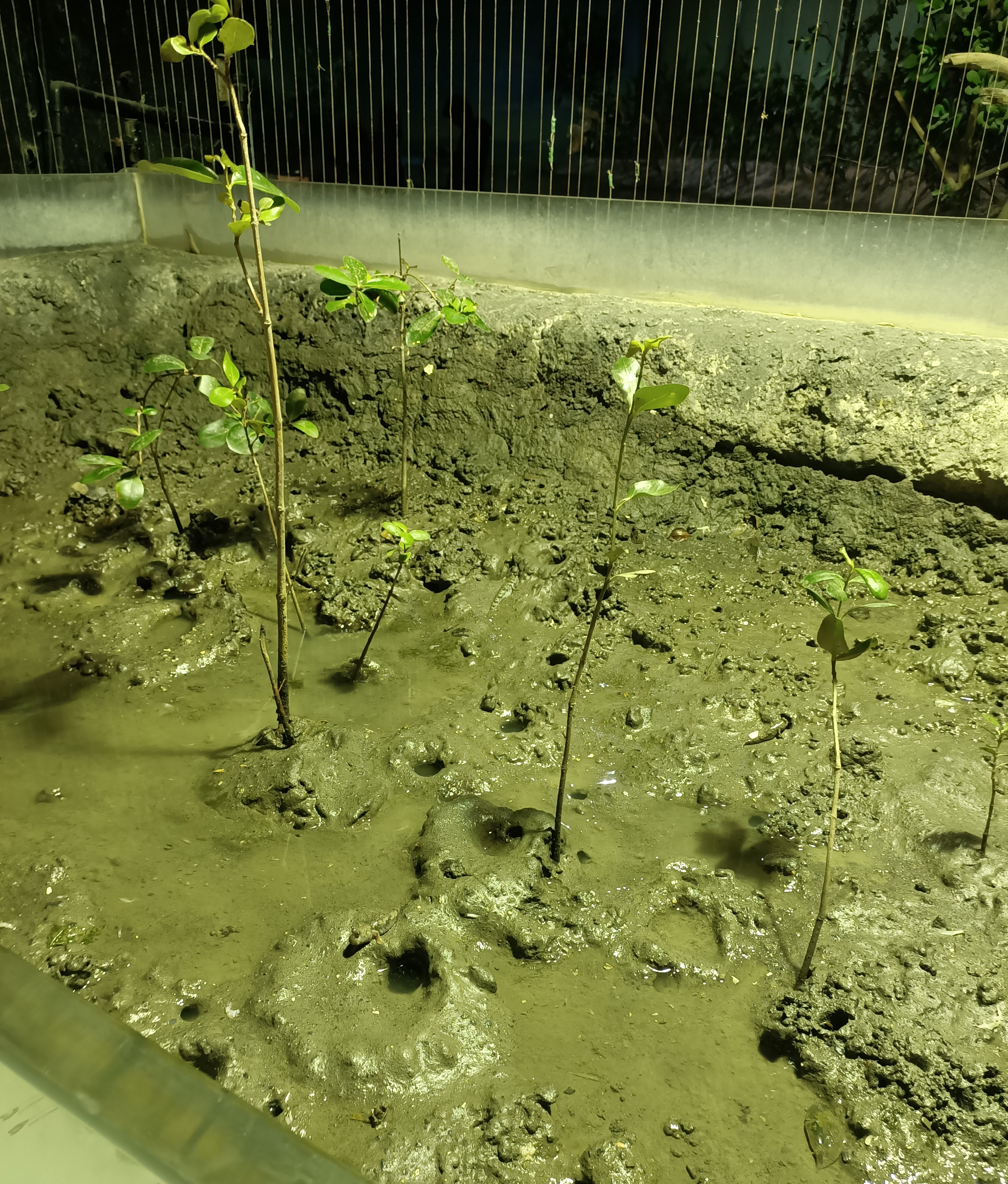
Mangrove mudflat exhibit featuring fiddler crabs and mudskippers

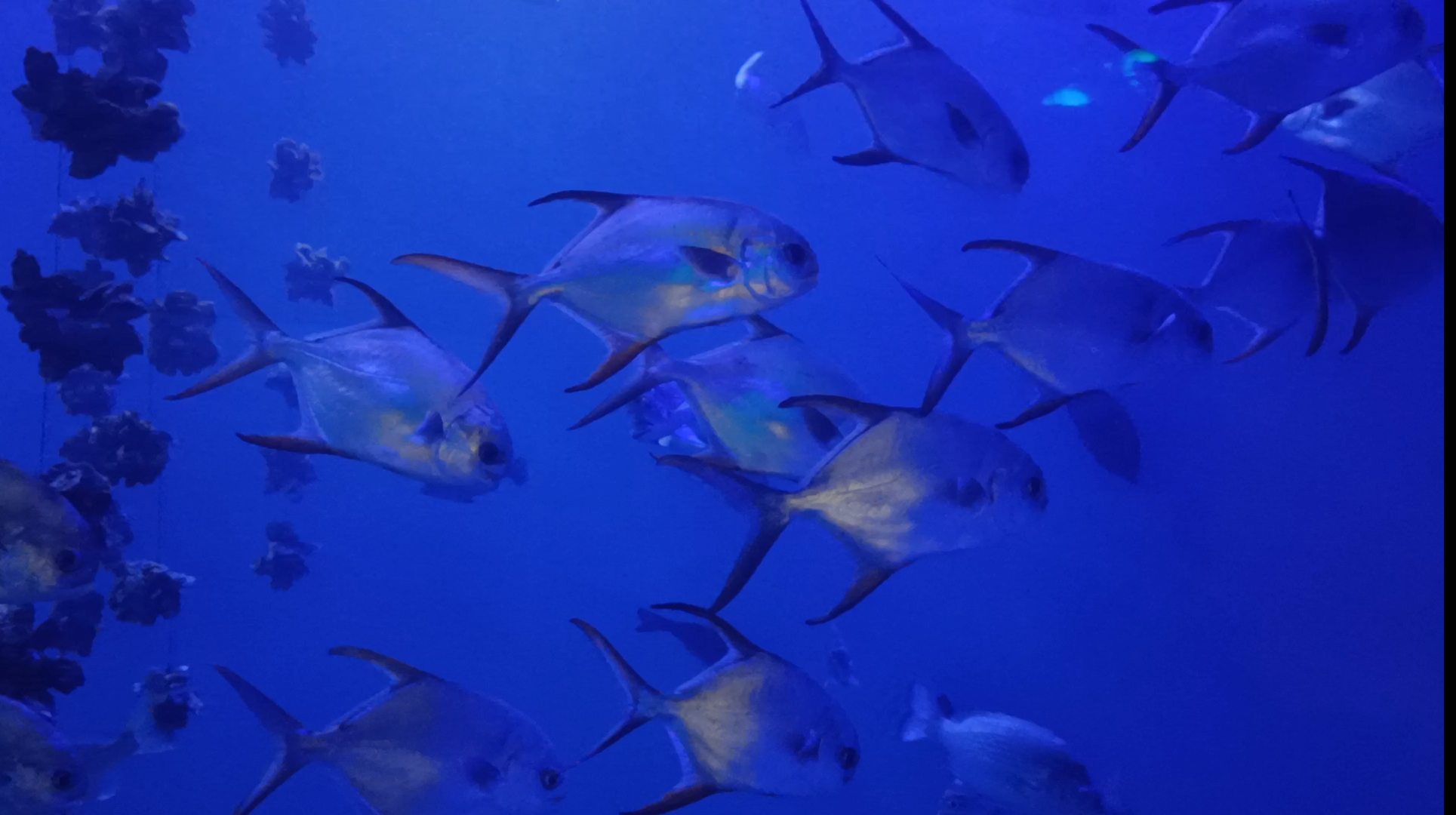
Snubnose pompano in the oyster farming exhibit

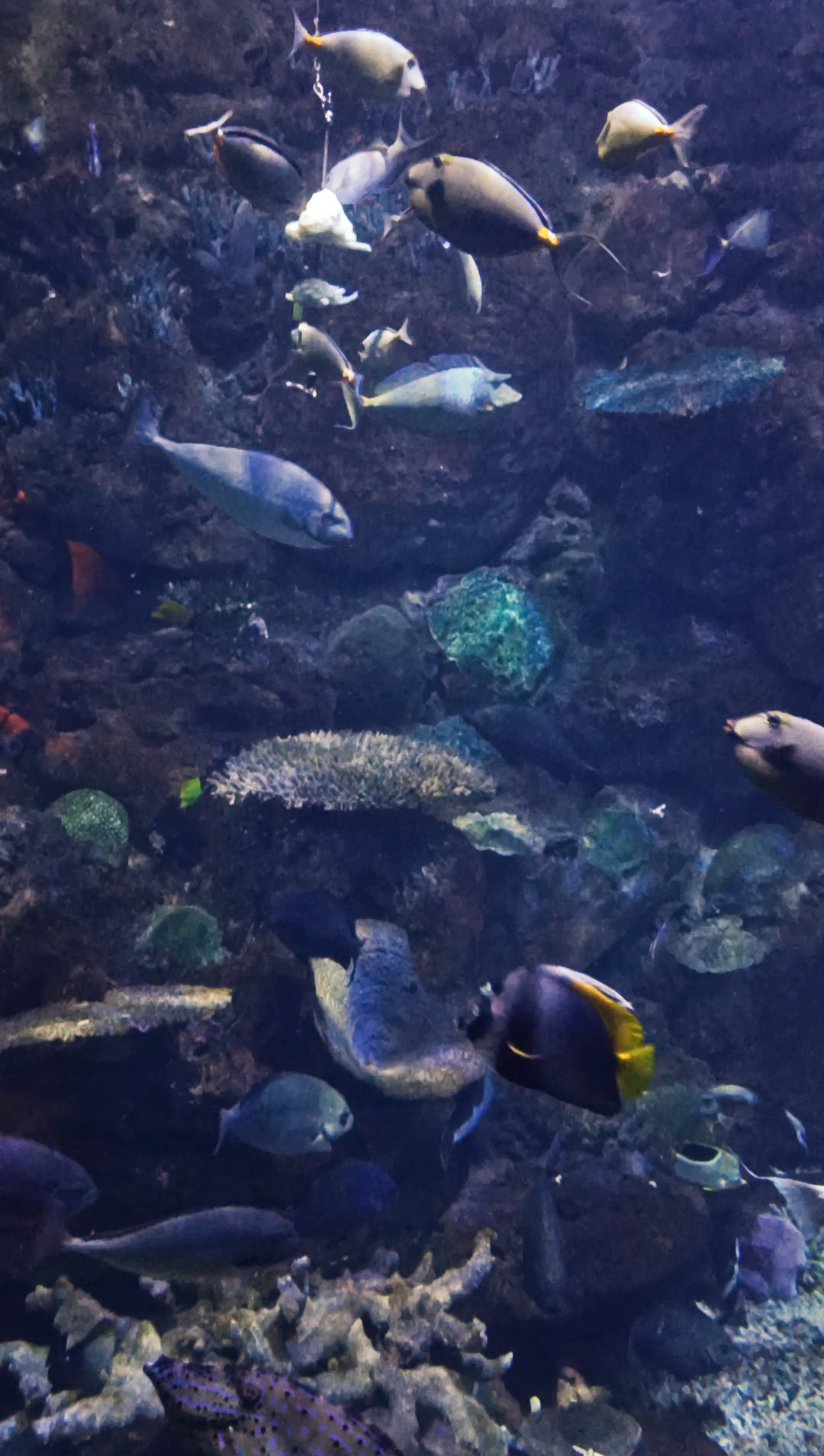
Nanwan coral reef exhibit, showcasing the coral reef ecosystem of Nanwan off the Hengchun Peninsula

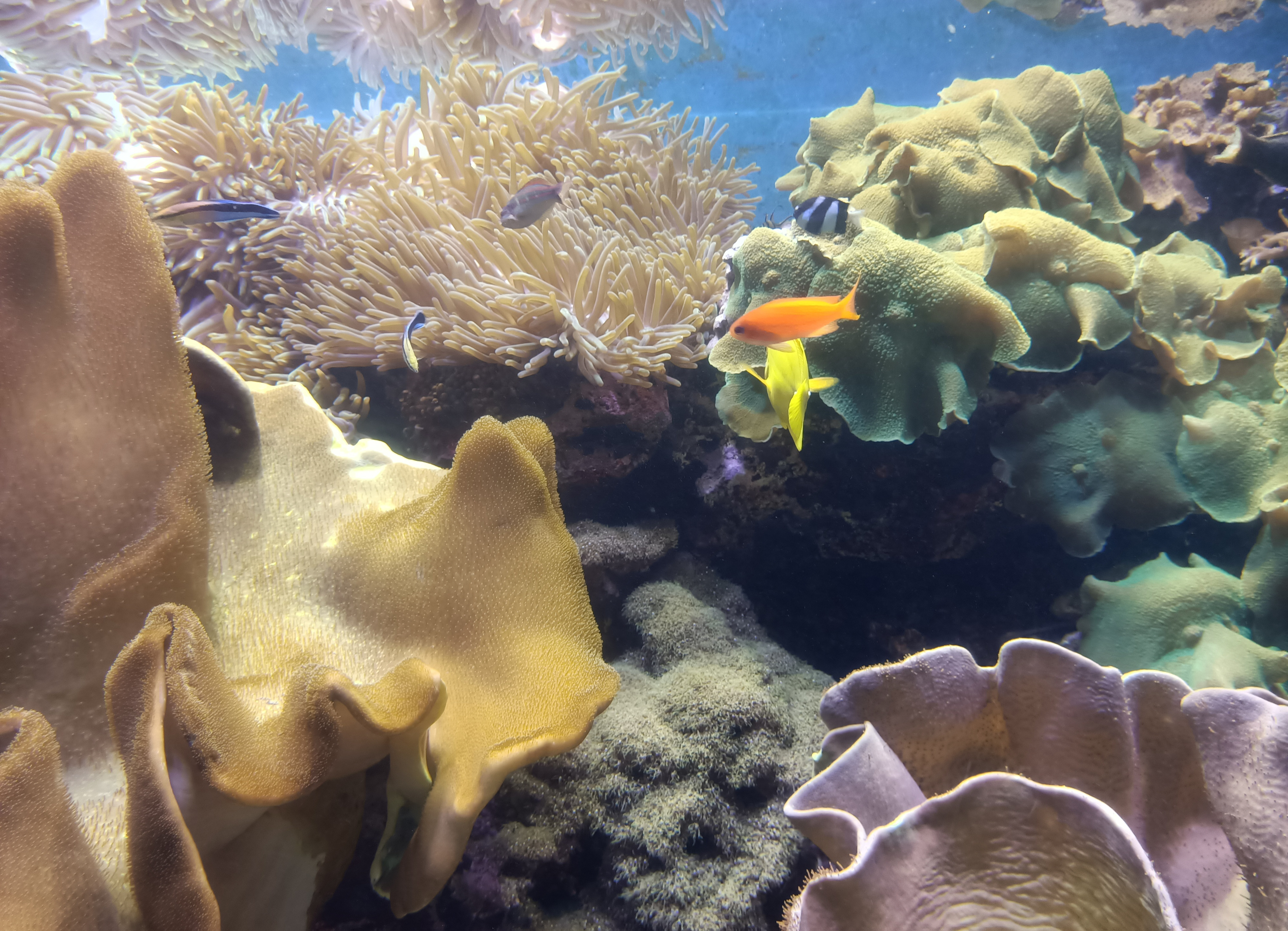
Soft coral exhibit featuring soft corals and sea anemones

=== Coral Kingdom Pavilion ===
The Coral Kingdom exhibit hall shows different coral reef habitats, from shallow waters to deep oceans. Differing environments based on sea depth, pressure, terrain, and light are shown. An underwater tunnel and a sunken ship are also part of the exhibit hall. At the end of exhibit hall is an 82.5-meter underwater tunnel and viewing panels showcasing the aquarium's four beluga whales. It is also possible to see the belugas from above water via a pavilion on the second floor. Animals on display include blacktip reef sharks, lionfish, moray eels, cownose rays, unicornfish, butterflyfish, and garden eels. Beluga whales are housed in an exhibit with a tunnel that allows underwater viewing.

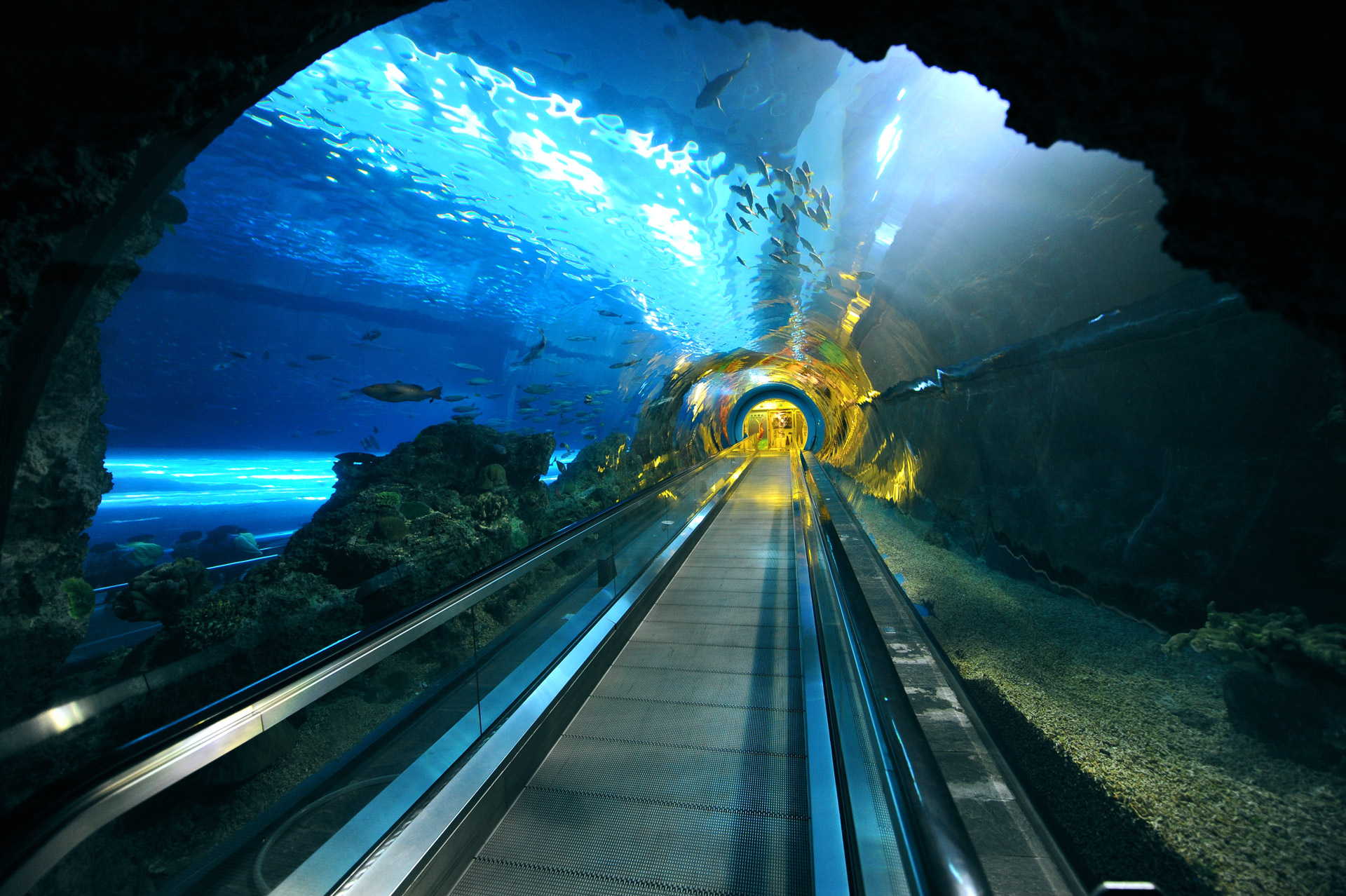
82.5-meter underwater tunnel

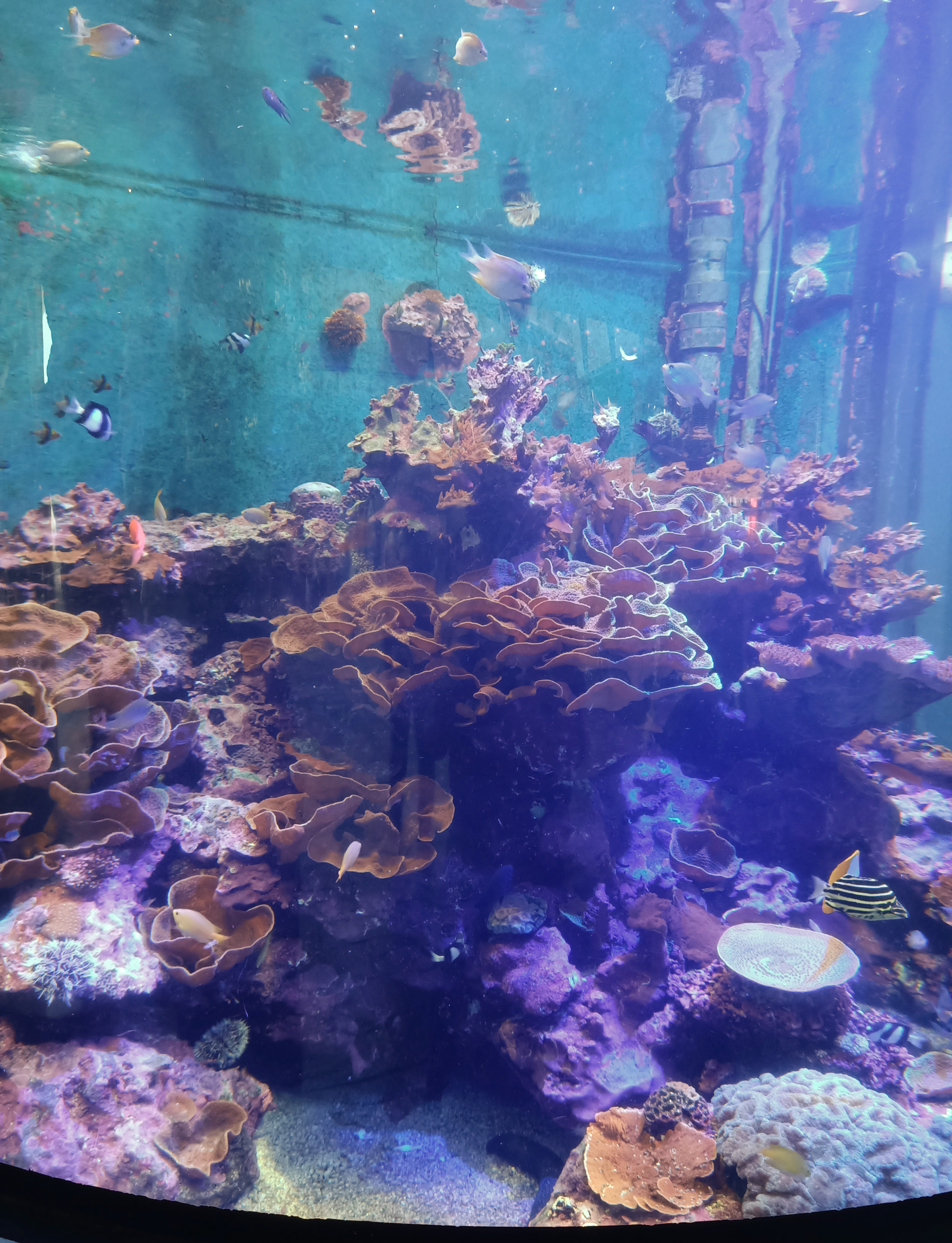
Reef Flat exhibit in the Coral Kingdom Pavilion

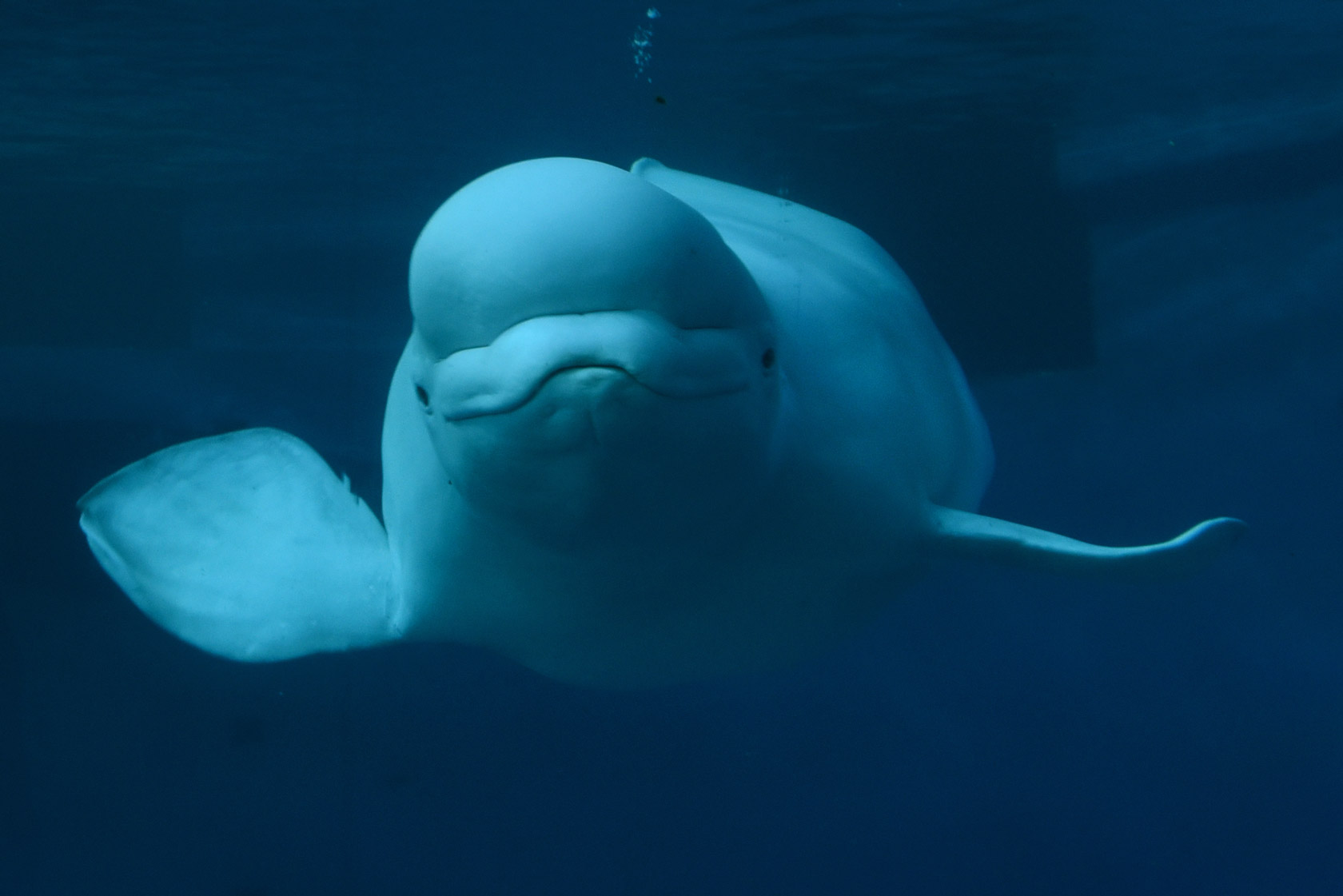
Beluga whale exhibit

=== Waters of the World ===
This exhibit covers ancient, Precambrian oceans as well as ocean formation.

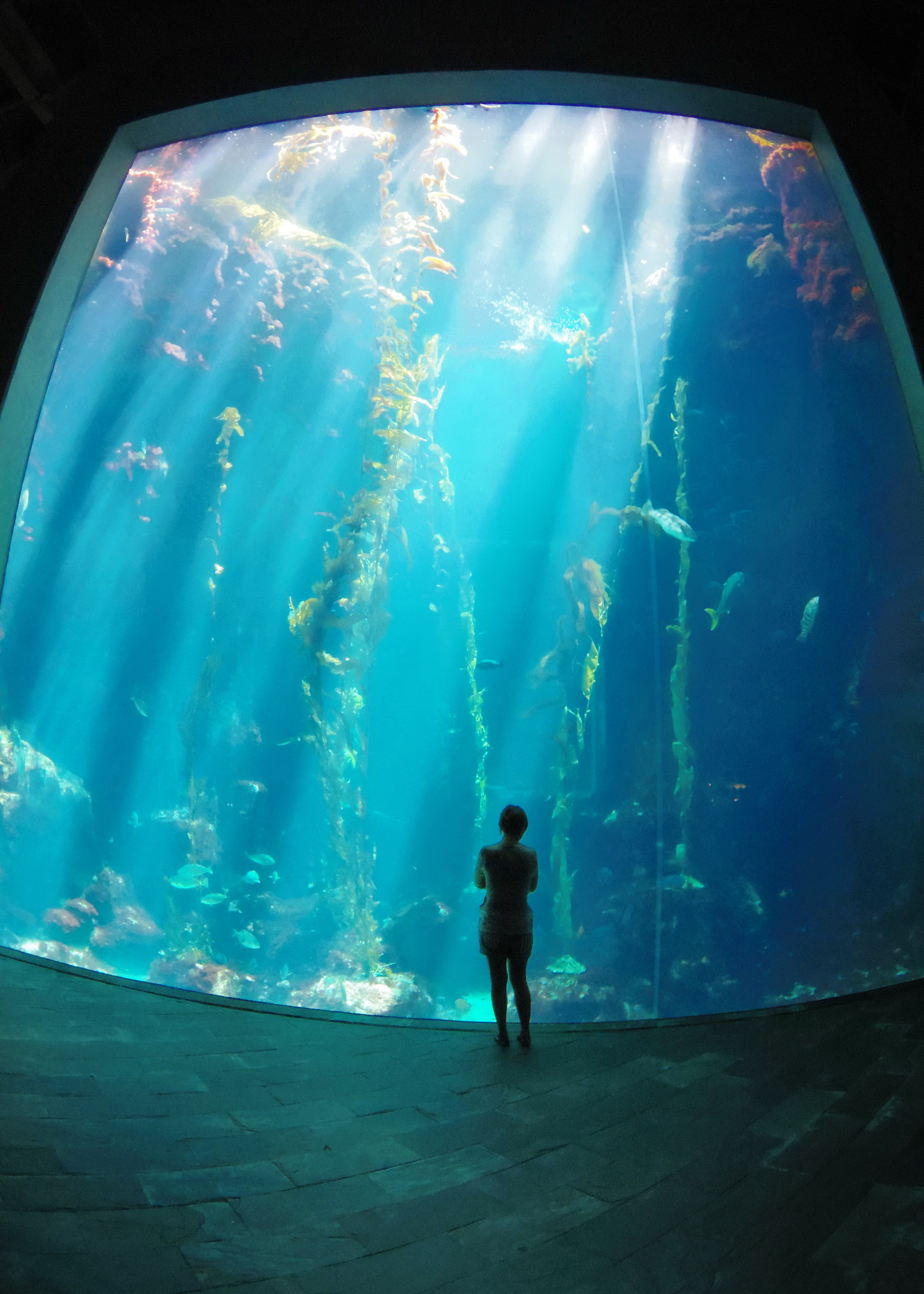
kelp forest exhibit recreating a temperate kelp forest ecosystem

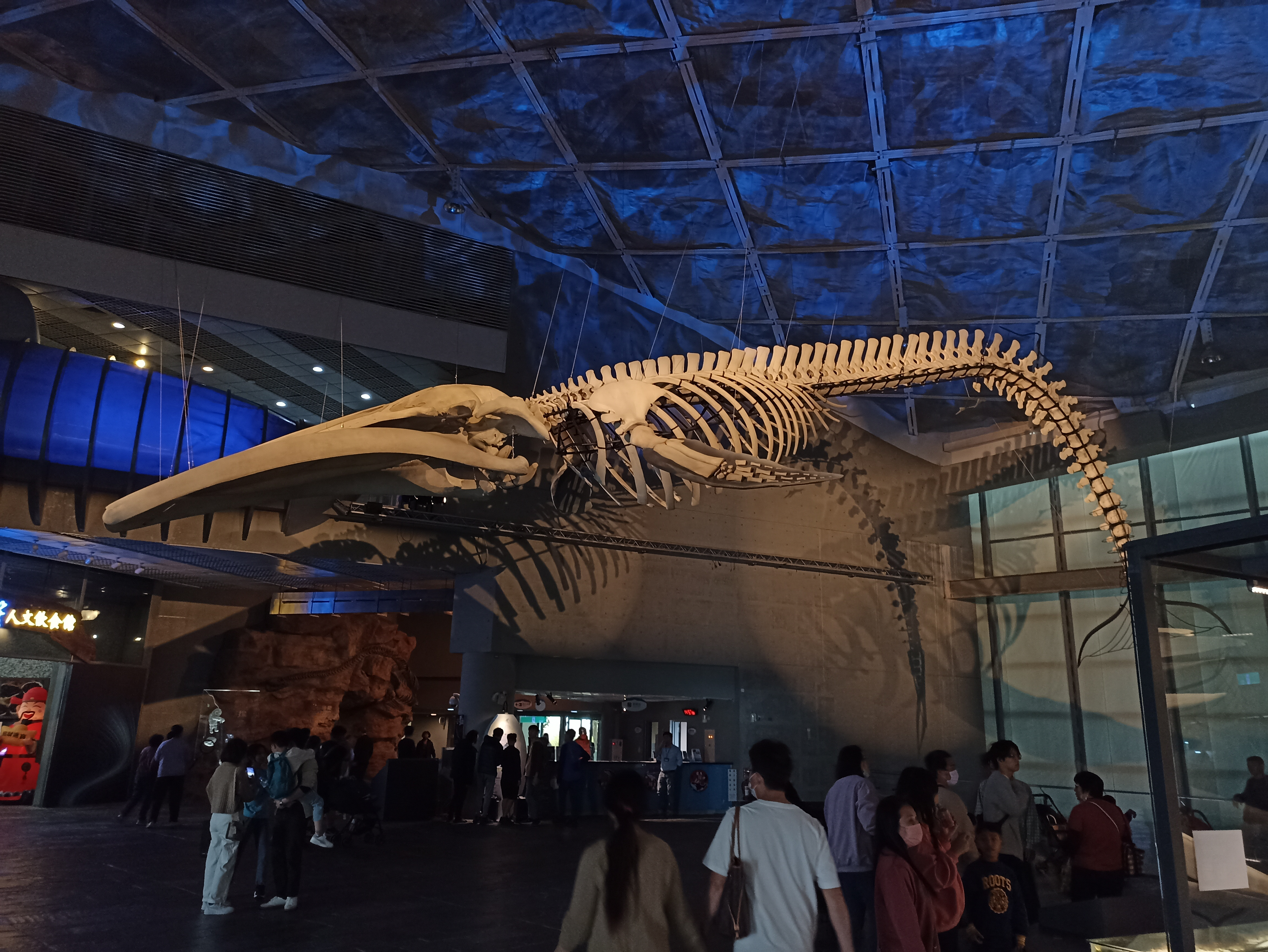
Blue whale skeleton on display in the lobby of the Waters of the World

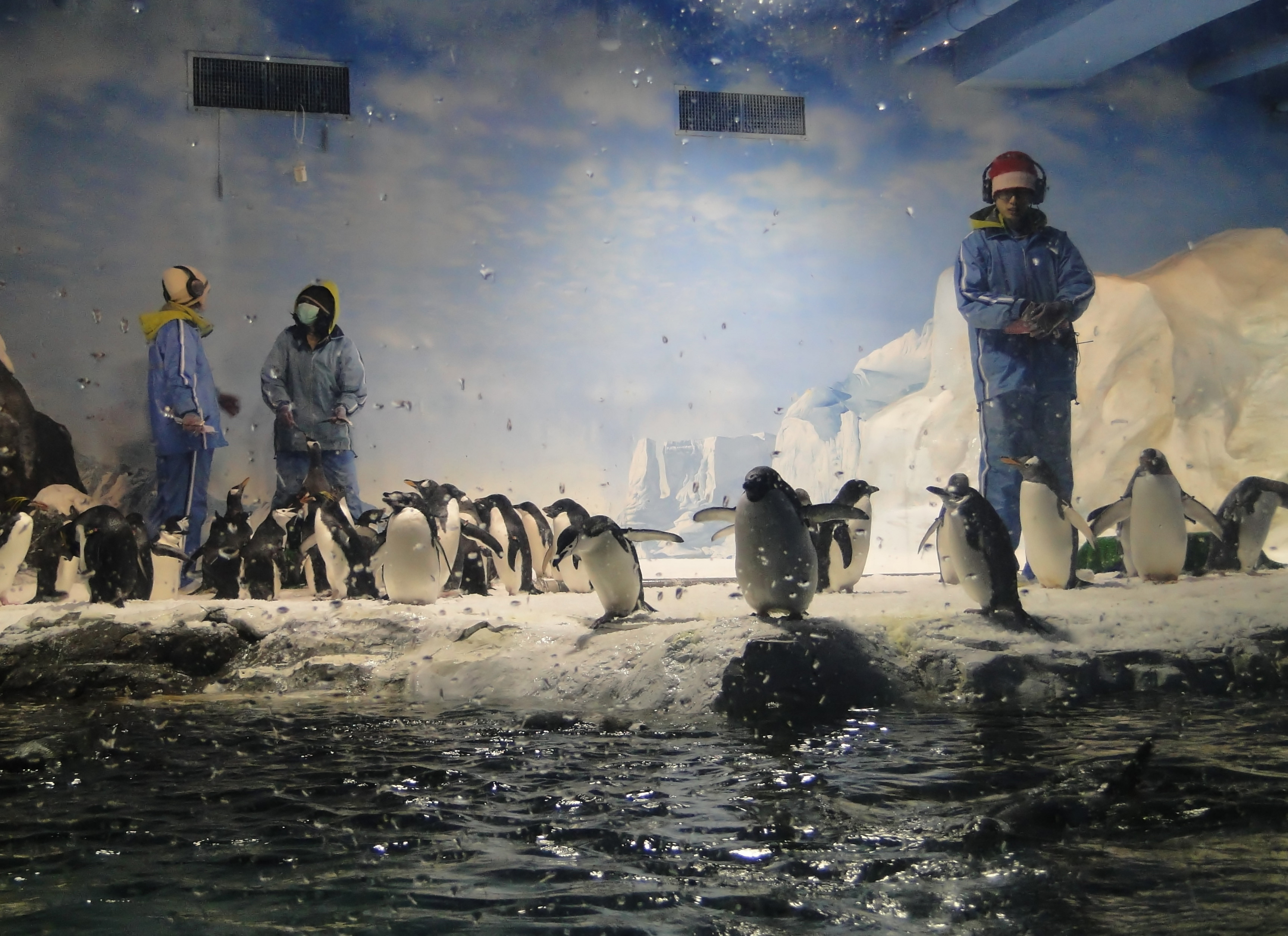
The penguin tank

== Research ==
Besides public exhibitions, there are two research buildings and a marine station in the museum, dedicated to research in marine biology and ecology, aquaculture, propagation and conservation of marine fauna and flora. Research carried out at NMMBA includes the effects of pollution on coral and fish and the effects of light on the developmental expression of fluorescent proteins.

In 2014, NMMBA became the first institution to breed the ringed pipefish (Dunckerocampus dactyliophorus) in captivity. The museum used underwater caves and fissured corals to provide an environment for the fish to hatch their eggs. In the 11th month after hatching, the first offspring began mating.

In 2018, the museum teamed up with the Frozen Ark global conservation project for freezing the DNA of local species living at the sea of Pingtung County.

== Controversies ==
In March 2013, Environment and Animal Society of Taiwan (EAST) accused NMMBA of keeping its whale shark in a tank that was too small for a deep-water animal. The shark, which is labeled “vulnerable” by the International Union for Conservation of Nature, had been kept at the aquarium since 2004. EAST claimed that the animal has scars on its tail from hitting coral and the sides of the tank. An official at the aquarium stated that there were plans to tag release the shark in the near future.

On 10 July 2013, the aquarium was again criticized for releasing the shark, without a GPS tracking device, in a manner that caused it to be stranded on the beach twice before being towed out to sea. According to an EAST spokesman, "What the aquarium did was not release the whale shark, the aquarium actually abandoned the shark". EAST expressed concern about the shark's ability to fend for itself after eight years in captivity and the lack of a tracking device that would have allowed scientists to follow its progress. According to the head of NMMBA, Wei-hsien Wang, it "didn't occur to us that it would refuse to swim away but rather would linger near the shore".

== See also ==
- List of museums in Taiwan
