= Checheng =

Rural township in Pingtung County, Taiwan

Coordinates: 22.079754°N 120.745727°E

Checheng Township 車城鄉 Chai-cheng
- Rural township
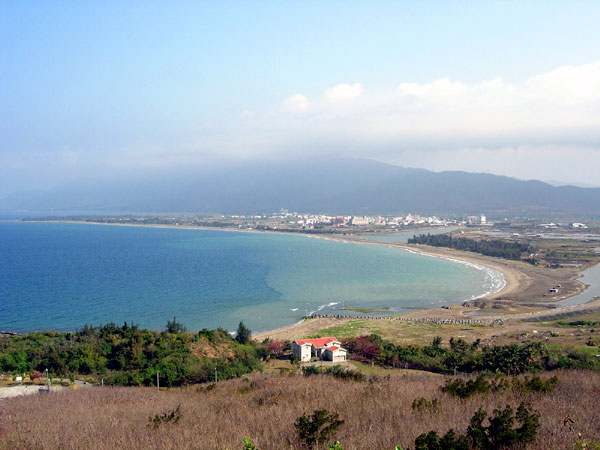

- Checheng Township in Pingtung County
- Location: Pingtung County, Taiwan

Area
  - Total: 50 km^{2} (19 sq mi)

Population (February 2024)
  - Total: 8,002
  - Density: 160/km^{2} (410/sq mi)

Checheng Township
- Traditional Chinese: 車城鄉
- Hanyu Pinyin: Chēchéng Xiāng
- Wade–Giles: Ch'e^{1}-ch'eng^{2} Hsiang^{1}
- Pha̍k-fa-sṳ: Tshâ-sàng-hiông
- Hokkien POJ: Chha-siâⁿ-hiong/Chhia-siâⁿ-hiong

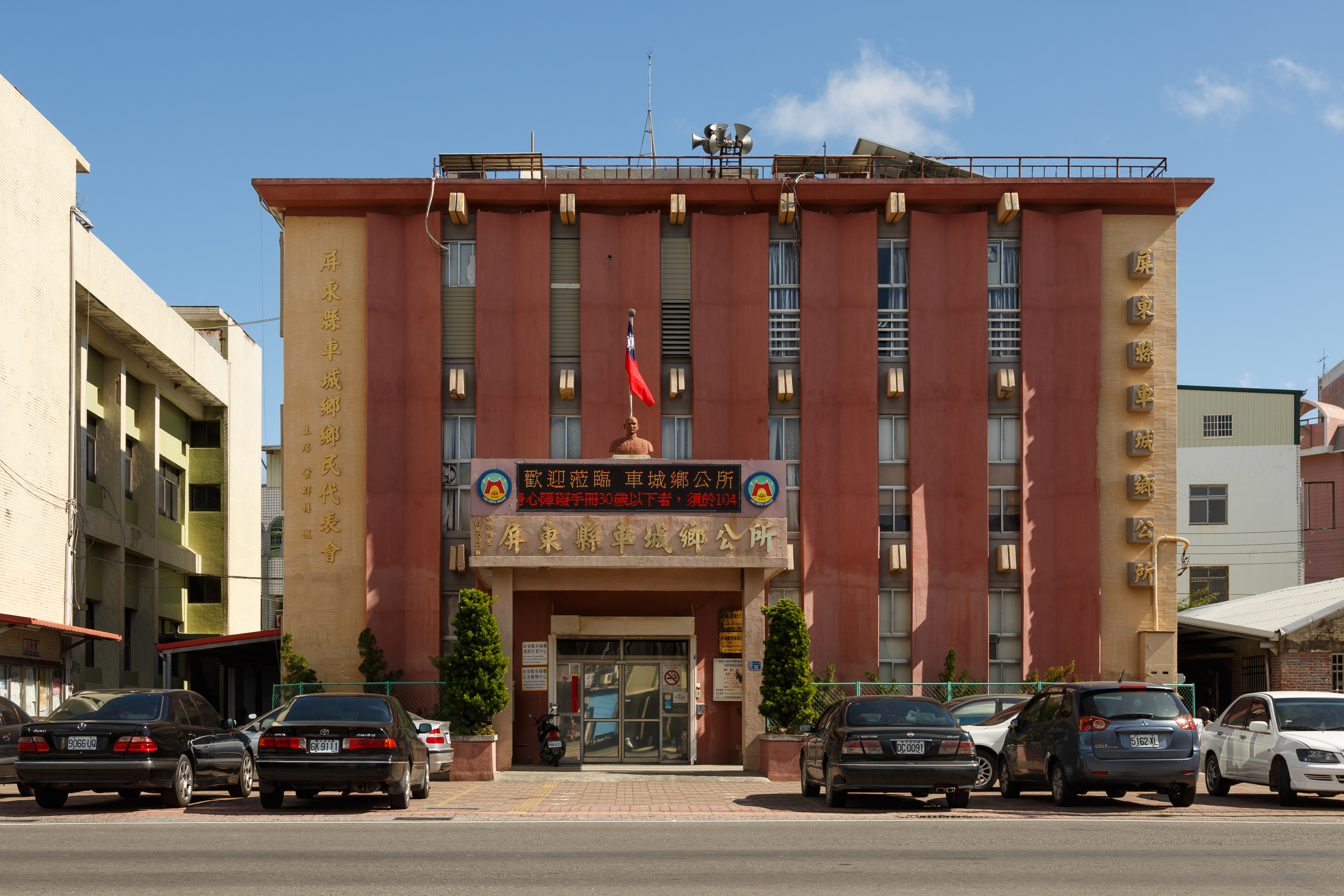
Checheng Township Office

Checheng Township is a rural township in Pingtung County, Taiwan.

== Names and etymology ==
The name of the town Checheng (Chinese: 車城; pinyin: Chēchéng) combines the Chinese character for "cart", 車 today used to refer to cars and other motorized transport, and 城 which is used in words for walled fortresses and cities, but which in the Taiwanese historical context refers to a town with an earthen security berm.

With the arrival of ethnic Chinese on Taiwan, the native Paiwan name of Kabeyawan was transliterated as Ku-piah-oan (龜壁灣) in the Taiwanese Hokkien language of these new settlers. Following the period of Dutch rule in the 17th century, the name Thóng-léng-po͘ (統領埔; Hakka: Thúng-liâng-phû) was used after Koxinga's son and successor Zheng Jing stationed troops there under a tongling (統領), a military officer with rank roughly equal to a battalion commander; The suffix po͘ (埔) is often used for place names in Taiwan. A village gradually grew up in the area.

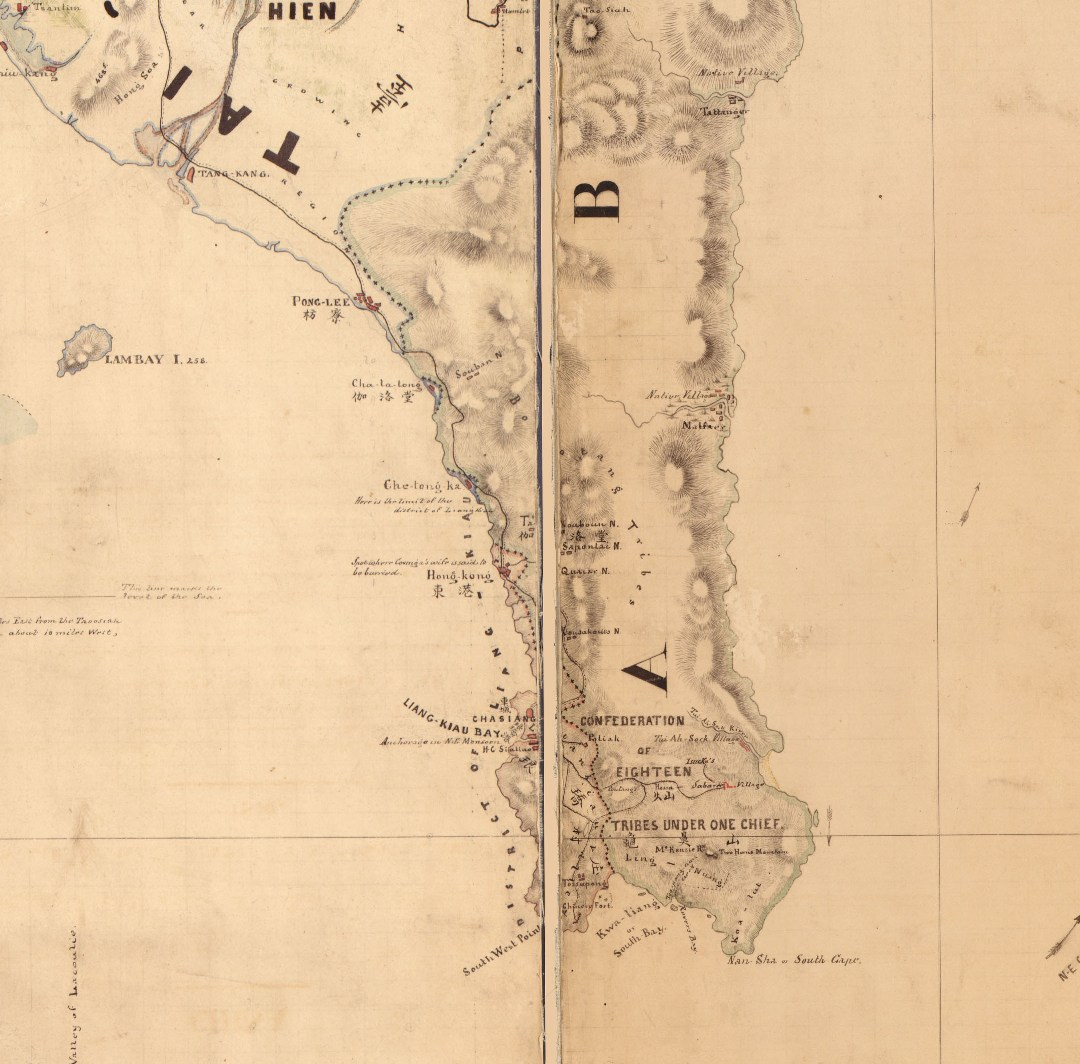
A portion of an 1870 map of Taiwan showing the Hengchun Peninsula with Checheng marked as "Chasiang"

After the Manchu Qing Dynasty assumed control of the lowlands of western Taiwan, ethnic Chinese settlers wanted protection from aboriginal attacks. A wooden palisade was built around the town giving rise to a new name, Chhâ-siâⁿ (柴城; Hakka: Tshài-sàng), using the character 柴 (chhâ) which is the Hokkien word for "wood". Thus Chhâ-siâⁿ has roughly the meaning of "stockade".

In 1788, the fifty-third year of the Qianlong Emperor's rule, Manchu general Fuk'anggan landed his army in the area to suppress the Lin Shuangwen rebellion. In commemoration, the town received yet another name Hok-an-chng (福安庄; also Hok-an-siâⁿ [福安城]), with 福 from Fuk'anggan's Chinese name and 安 for "pacified", plus 庄, meaning "hamlet".

The origin of the town's current name Checheng is disputed. Some such as Japanese anthropologist Inō Kanori believe that it arose as a mispronunciation of Chhâ-siâⁿ (柴城); the pronunciations of 柴 and 車 are similar in both Hokkien and Hakka, chhâ/chhia and tshài/tshâ respectively. Another theory is that as an aboriginal army approached the town, the inhabitants used dozens of oxcarts carrying charcoal to lined up as a defense.

Today, Hokkien-speaking inhabitants continue to pronounce the name of the town with the older Chhâ-siâⁿ, though the written form is almost inevitably 車城. English-language maps and sources have historically used spellings such as Chasiang that reflect this pronunciation.

== Geography ==
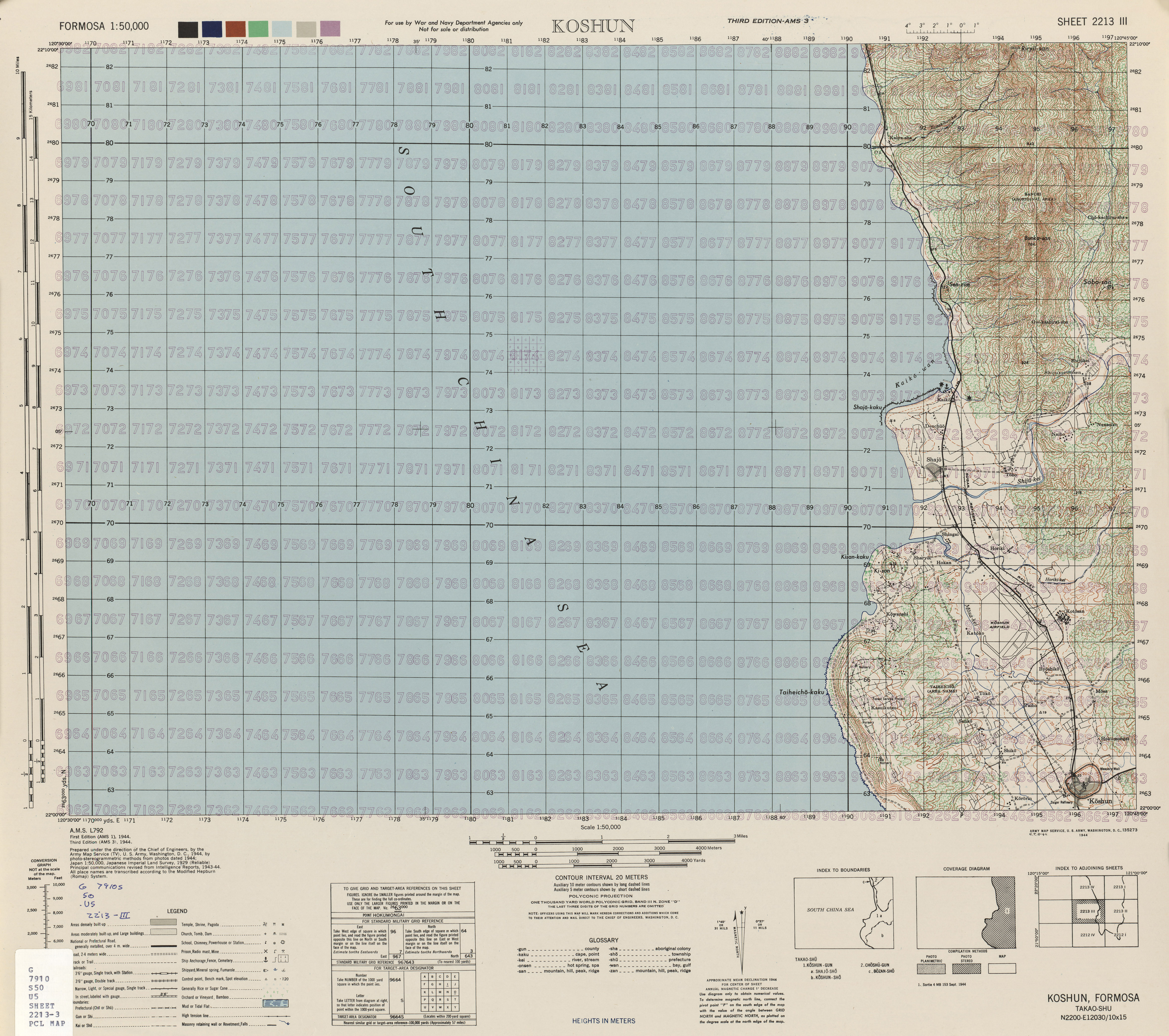

Area: 49.85 square kilometres (19.25 sq mi)
Population: 8,002 (February 2024)

== Administrative divisions ==
The township comprises 11 villages: Baoli, Fuan, Fuxing, Haikou, Houwan, Puqi, Sheliao, Tianzhong, Tongpu, Wenquan and Xinjie.

== Education ==
- National Pingtung University

== Tourist attractions ==
- Checheng Fu'an Temple
- Kenting National Park
- National Museum of Marine Biology and Aquarium
- Sichongxi Hot Spring
- Dongyuan Forest Recreation Area and Dongyuan Wet Grassland
- Shihmen Ancient battle Field and Mudan Incident Memorial Park
- Syuhai Grassland Recreation Area
- Hsi Chung River Hot Spring
- HaiKou
- Gourmet: Huang's peeled mung bean desert

== Notable natives ==
- Pan Men-an, Magistrate of Pingtung County
