= List of doctoral degrees awarded by country =

The list of doctoral degrees awarded by country includes all doctoral degrees worldwide.

== Argentina ==
- Doctor of Applied Science
- Doctor of Basic Science
- Doctor of Science
- Doctor of Arts
- Doctor of Administration
- Doctor of Chemistry
- Doctor of Informatics
- Doctor of Criminology
- Doctor of Design
- Doctor of Education
- Doctor of Engineering
- Doctor of Law
- Doctor of Literature
- Doctor of Medicine
- Doctor of Music
- Doctor of Philosophy
- Doctor of Physical Education
- Doctor of Psychology
- Doctor of Veterinary Medicine
- Doctor of Social Science

== Czech Republic and Slovakia ==
The system of Czech and Slovak doctoral degrees has been inherited from Czechoslovakia and is for a large part identical.

=== Doctoral degrees gained after graduation ===
- Doctor of medicine (Medicinæ universæ doctor – MUDr.)
- Doctor of dental medicine (Medicinæ dentium doctor – MDDr.)
- Doctor of veterinary medicine (Medicinæ veterinariæ doctor – MVDr.)

These degrees are written before the name and are considered as professional doctorates comparable to the US Doctor of Medicine (M.D.) degree.

=== Doctoral degrees gained by thesis, viva voce and rigorous examination ===
- Doctor of philosophy (Doktor filozofie – PhDr.)
- Doctor of natural sciences (Rerum naturalium doctor – RNDr.)
- Doctor of pharmacy (Pharmaciæ doctor – PharmDr.)
- Doctor of laws (Juris utrisque doctor – JUDr.)
- Doctor of paedeutics (Paedagogiæ doctor – PaedDr., no longer used in the Czech Republic)
- Doctor of theology (Theologiæ doctor – ThDr.)
- Doctor of economy (Rerum commercialum doctor – RCDr., no longer used)
- Doctor of social sciences (Rerum socialium doctor – RSDr., deprecated – used by the Czechoslovak communist regime)

These degrees are written before the name.

Doctoral degrees gained after a rigorous examination are popularly called small doctorate (malý doktorát in Czech or Slovak). Applicants need a master's degree or a post-graduate degree (5 years+) comparable to Master level or higher and have to write a thesis of 50,000-80,000 words and defend this thesis in a viva voce and a rigorous examination in at least 2-3 subjects.

=== Doctoral degrees gained after post-graduate study ===
- Candidate of Sciences (Candidatus scientiarum – CSc., replaced by common Ph.D. in the Czech Republic in 1998 and by PhD. in Slovakia in 1996)
- Doctor of philosophy (Philosophiae doctor – Ph.D. or PhD., awarded since 1998 and 1996, respectively; requires at least 3–5-year doctoral study and coursework of 120-180 Credits)
- Doctor of theology (Theologiae doctor – Th.D.) – doctoral study in theology
- Doctor of sciences (Doctor scientiarum – DrSc. (no longer used in the Czech Republic); prerequisite: a Ph.D.-level degree)

These degrees are written after the name.

Doctoral degrees gained after post-graduate study are popularly called great doctorate (velký doktorát in Czech).

=== Other doctoral degrees ===
- Doctor of sciences (Doctor scientiarum – DSc) - highest appreciation of scientific work, granting from the Academy of Sciences of the Czech Republic
- Honorary Doctorate (Doctor honoris causa – Dr.h.c.) – honorary degree, usually it is not in use.

These degrees are written after the name.

Both Czech and Slovak orthography state that the 'philosophiae doctor' is abbreviated as 'PhD.' in analogy to all of the other degrees, however, perhaps under influence of international use of 'Ph.D.', this foreign form is used in the Czech Law of the Academic and Scientific Degrees. In fact, Czech lawgivers have enacted an orthographical mistake.

== Denmark ==
The Danish ph.d. degree has no further subdivisions and grants the holder the postposed title of ph.d.. The higher doctor grants the holder the title of dr. or doktor. In the case of an honorary doctorate, h.c. (honoris causa) is added. The higher doctorate is issued in varieties dependent on the field:

- dr.agro. (doctor agronomiae) – Agronomy
- dr.jur. (doctor juris) – Law
- dr.ling.merc. (doctor linguae mercantilis) – Business language
- dr.med. (doctor medicinae) – Medicine
- dr.med.vet. (doctor medicinae veterinariae) - Veterinary medicine
- dr.merc (doctor mercaturae) – Business economics
- dr.odont. (doctor odontologiae) – Odontology
- dr.oecon. (doctor oeconomices) – Economy
- dr.pharm. (doctor pharmaciae) – Pharmacy
- dr.phil. (doctor philosophiae) – Philosophy
- dr.polit. (doctor politices) – Economics
- dr.psyk. (doctor psychologiae) – Psychology
- dr.pæd. (doctor pædagogiae) – Pedagogics
- dr.rer.soc (doctor rerum socialium) – Social science
- dr.scient. (doctor scientiarum) – Natural sciences
- dr.scient.adm. (doctor scientiarum administrationis) – Administration
- dr.scient.ant. (doctor scientiarum anthropologicarum) – Anthropology
- dr.scient.pol (doctor scientiarum politicarum) – Political science
- dr.scient.soc. (doctor scientiarum socialium) – Sociology
- dr.techn. (doctor technices) – Technology/engineering
- dr.theol. (doctor theologiae) – Theology

== Finland ==
This list is comprehensive list of doctoral decrees granted by Finnish universities, based on the Government decree on university degrees. The English translations are official.

- Elintarviketieteiden tohtori – Doctor of Food Science
- Eläinlääketieteen tohtori – Doctor of Veterinary Medicine
- Farmasian tohtori– Doctor of Science (Pharmacy)
- Filosofian tohtori – Doctor of Philosophy
- Hallintotieteiden tohtori – Doctor of Administrative Sciences
- Kasvatustieteen tohtori – Doctor of Philosophy (Education)
- Kauppatieteiden tohtori – Doctor of Science (Economics and Business Administration)
- Kuvataiteen tohtori – Doctor of Fine Arts
- Liikuntatieteiden tohtori – Doctor of Philosophy (Sport and Health Sciences)
- Lääketieteen tohtori – Doctor of Medical Science
- Maatalous- ja metsätieteiden tohtori – Doctor of Science (Agriculture and Forestry)
- Musiikin tohtori – Doctor of Music
- Oikeustieteen tohtori – Doctor of Laws
- Psykologian tohtori – Doctor of Psychology
- Taiteen tohtori – Doctor of Arts (Art and Design)
- Tanssitaiteen tohtori – Doctor of Arts (Dance)
- Teatteritaiteen tohtori – Doctor of Arts (Theater and Drama)
- Tekniikan tohtori – Doctor of Science (Technology) or Doctor of Science (Architecture)
- Teologian tohtori – Doctor of Theology
- Terveystieteiden tohtori – Doctor of Health Sciences
- Valtiotieteiden tohtori – Doctor of Social Sciences
- Yhteiskuntatieteiden tohtori – Doctor of Social Sciences

== France ==
- Doctorat: Ph.D. equivalent. Traditional mentions are :
  - Doctorat ès lettres: Doctorate of Letters.
  - Doctorat ès sciences:Doctorate of Science.
  - Doctorat en droit; Doctorate of Laws.
- Diplôme d'État de docteur (State Degree of Doctor): professional doctorate equivalent.
  - Diplôme d'État de chirurgien dentiste: Doctor of Dental Surgery.
  - Diplôme d’État de docteur en médecine: Doctor of Medicine.
  - Diplôme d'État de docteur en pharmacie: Doctor of Pharmacy.
  - Diplôme d'État de docteur vétérinaire: Doctor of Veterinary Medicine.
- Until 1984 existed a higher doctorate called Doctorat d'État and a junior doctorate called Doctorat de troisième cycle.

== Germany ==
- Dr. h.c. (Doctor honoris causa - honorary doctor), but: Dr.-Ing. E.h. (German: ehrenhalber)
- Dr.-Ing. (Doktor der Ingenieurwissenschaften - engineering, sometimes Computer Science)
- Dr. iur. (Doctor iuris - law), also: Dr. jur. although this is not the correct spelling
- Dr. iur. utr. (Doctor iuris utriusque - both Laws, secular and Canon Law, "Doktor beider Rechte" (weltliches und kanonisches Recht))
- Dr. habil. (Doctor habilitatus - professorial qualification, higher doctorate awarded to candidates who finished the habilitation)
- Dr. oec. pub. (Doctor œconomiae publicae - business administration ("Betriebswirtschaftslehre") or macro- and micro-economics ("Volkswirtschaftslehre"))
- Dr. theol. (Doctor theologiae - theology)
- Dr. paed. (Doctor paed. - education ("Doktor der Pädagogik"))
- Dr. phil. (Doctor philosophiae - most of the humanities)
- Dr. rer. medic. and Dr. med. sci.(Doctor rerum medicinalium - "Doktor der Medizinwissenschaften", Doctor of Medical Science)
- Dr. rer. physiol. (Doctor rerum physiologicarum - Doctor of Biomedicine and or Human Biology)
- Dr. rer. nat. (Doctor rerum naturalium - literally "Doctor of natural things" - all natural sciences, mathematics and computer science)
- Dr. rer. biol. hum. (rerum biologiae humanae) - "Doctor of Human Biology"
- Dr. rer. soc. (Doctor rerum socialium. - social sciences ("Doktor der Sozialwissenschaften"))
- Dr. rer. pol. (Doctor rerum politicarum - economics, business administration, sociology and related subjects)
- Dr. med. (Doctor medicinae - medicine), also Dr. med. dent. for dentists and Dr. med. vet. for veterinarians

== Ireland ==
- Doctor of Governance (DGov)

== Netherlands ==
The Netherlands does not distinguish between different research doctorates bestowed by research universities. All research doctorates are Ph.D. without any further specification. Under Dutch law only those with a PhD can use the title "doctor".

The Netherlands has one professional doctorate in Engineering bestowed by the (research) universities of technology (first abbreviated as PDEng - professional doctorate in engineering but since renamed to EngD).

Since 2023, Dutch Universities of Applied Sciences have been piloting a Professional Doctorate (UAS-PD), a practice-oriented doctoral program designed to develop research professionals within applied sciences. Unlike traditional PhD programs, the UAS-PD emphasizes solving practical challenges in professional contexts. Van Houten critically compares the UAS-PD with professional doctorates in the United Kingdom. He posits that anglo-saxon professional doctorates that contain a clear academic component, related to a specific profession, but are furthermore largely comparable to a Dutch PhD. The proposed Dutch UAS-PD is however more practice oriented which may create challenges related to international recognition of the degree. The programme features identified as particularly relevant to its recognition include the institution’s awarding powers, admission routes, required research outputs, viva or defence requirements and the involvement of external examiners. The exact naming of a future title was still not settled upon by mid 2026.

- Doctor / PhD
- Engineering Doctorate (EngD) - legal status in process of legalisation as of April 2026
- Professional Doctorate (PD) - legal status in process of legalisation as of April 2026

== Pakistan ==
- Doctor of Medicine (MD)
- Doctor of Pharmacy (PharmD)
- Doctor of Philosophy (PhD)
- Doctor of Science (DSc)
- Doctor of Law
- Doctor of Veterinary Medicine (DVM)
- Doctor of Nutrition and Dietetics (DND)
- Doctor of Physiotherapy (DPT)
- Fellow of College of Physicians and Surgeons Pakistan (FCPS)
- doctor of optometry (OD)

== South Africa ==
See: List of universities in South Africa

- Doctor of Philosophy (PhD or DPhil) offered at Traditional Universities
- Doctor of Engineering (DEng or DIng) offered at Traditional Universities
- Doctor of Science (DSc) offered at Traditional Universities; may be the Higher doctorate in Science
- Doctor of Business Administration (DBA) Offered at Business Schools
- Doctor of Literature and Philosophy (DLitt et Phil) offered at the University of South Africa and other formerly Afrikaans Universities
- Doctor of Technology (DTech, also "Doctor Technologiae") offered at the Universities of Technology
- Doctor of Laws (LLD) offered at South African Law schools; at some, the Higher doctorate in Law - see Doctor of Law#South Africa

== Sri Lanka ==
- Doctor of Philosophy (PhD or DPhil)
- Doctor of Science (DSc)
- Doctor of Laws (LLD)
- Doctor of Letters (DLitt)
- Doctor of Medicine (MD)
- Doctor of Business Administration (DBA)

== United Kingdom ==
=== First doctorates ===
Graduate-entry degrees in which the candidate must prepare (usually over a period of three or four years full-time, under the supervision of a more experienced researcher) a thesis or other portfolio of publishable research, demonstrating a contribution to knowledge in the chosen field. The Quality Assurance Agency categorises doctorates into three types: "subject specialist doctorates", "doctorates by publication", and "professional and practice-based (or practitioner) doctorates". Doctorates in the last category, such as the EdD, DClinPsych, DBA and EngD, have a greater emphasis on applied research and professional practice, however they still contain a substantial research component.

==== Subject specialist doctorates ====
- Doctor of Philosophy (PhD or DPhil)
  - Integrated subject specialist doctorates are usually qualified as 'Integrated PhD', 'PhD by integrated study' or 'PhD with integrated study'.
- European Doctorate (DocEuro)

==== Doctorates by publication ====
- Doctor of Philosophy by publication or Doctor of Philosophy by published works (PhD or DPhil)

==== Professional and practice-based (or practitioner) doctorates ====
If not given a generic title, these are frequently titled 'Doctor of [subject name]', with the abbreviation D[subject abbreviation] or [subject abbrecation]D.

Generic titles:

- Doctor of Work-based Learning (DProf)
- Professional Doctorate (ProfDoc, DProf or Prof.D)
- Doctor of Professional Practice/Doctorate in Professional Practice (DProf)
- Doctor of Professional Studies (DProf or DPS)

Health, Medicine and related subjects:

- Professional Doctorate in Advanced Healthcare Practice (DAHP)
- Doctor of Applied Education and Child Psychology (Ap.Ed and ChildPsy D)
- Doctor of Applied Educational Psychology (Professional Training) (DAppEdPsy)
- Doctor of Applied Psychology (Education) (DAppPsyEd)
- Doctor of Clinical Psychology (DClinPsy or DClinPsych)
- Doctor of Clinical Science–Psychotherapy (DClinSci–Psychotherapy)
- Doctor of Counselling Psychology (DCounsPsy)
- Doctor of Dental Surgery (DDS)
- Doctor of Dental Science (DDSc)
- Doctor of Educational Psychology (DEdPsy)
- Doctor of Forensic Psychology Practice (Foren.Psy.D or DForenPsy)
- Doctor of Health Research (DHRes)
- Doctor of Health Science (HScD)
  - Doctor of Health Science (Clinical) (HScD (Clin))
- Doctor of Health Studies (DHS)
- Doctor of Medicine (MD or MD (Res)) (In most universities this degree is a first doctorate, although some classify it as a higher doctorate.)
- Doctor of Occupational Psychology (DOccPsych)
- Doctor of Psychology (DPsych)
- Doctor of Public Health (DrPH)
- Professional Doctorate in Workplace Health and Wellbeing (DocWHW)

Other subjects:

- Doctor of Architecture (DArch)
- Professional Doctorate in Architecture, Design and Built Environment (DArch)
- Professional Doctorate in Agriculture and Food (DAgriFood)
- Doctor of Business Administration (DBA)
- Doctor of the Built Environment (DBEnv)
- Doctor in Civil Engineering (EngD)
- Doctor in Construction (EngD)
- Doctor of Construction Management (DConsMgt)
- Doctorate in Creative Arts (DCreative)
- Professional Doctorate in Criminal Justice (DCrimJ)
- Professional Doctorate in Security Risk Management (DSyRM)
- Doctorate in Criminology and Criminal Justice (DCCJ)
- Professional Doctorate in Applied Criminology (DAppCrim)
- Professional Doctorate in Data Science (DDataSci)
- Doctorate in Design/Doctor of Design (DDes)
- Doctor of Digital Media (DDM)
- Doctor of Education/Professional Doctorate in Education (EdD)
- Doctor of Engineering (EngD or DEng)
- Doctor of Fashion Industry (DFI)
- Doctor of Fine Art (DArt)
- Doctorate in Fine Arts/Doctor of Fine Art (DFA)
- Doctorate in Heritage (DHeritage)
- Doctor of Legal Practice (DLegalPrac)
- Professional Doctorate in Applied Linguistics (DAppLing)
- Doctor of Management (DMan)
- Doctor of Ministry (DMin)
- Doctorate in Music (DMus)
- Doctor of Musical Arts (DMA or AMusD)
- Doctor of Practical Theology (DPT)
- Doctor of Public Management (DPM)
- Doctor of Public Policy (DPP)
- Professional Doctorate in Policy Research and Practice (DPRP)
- Doctor of Real Estate (DRealEst)
- Professional Doctorate in Security Risk Management (DSyRM)
- Doctor of Social and Public Policy (SPPD)
- Doctor of Social Practice (DSocPrac)
- Doctor of Social Science/Doctorate in Social science (DSocSci)
- Doctor of Social Work (DSW)
- Doctorate in Sport and Exercise (DSE)
- Doctor of Theology (Th.D.)
- Professional Doctorate in Pastoral Theology (DPT)
- Doctor of Practical Theology (DPT)
- Professional Doctorate in Practical Theology (DPracTheol or DThM)
- Professional Doctorate in Veterinary Science (DVet)
- Doctor of Veterinary Medicine (DVM)
- Doctor of Veterinary Science (DVet Med, DVSc or DVS)

=== Higher doctorates ===
Higher doctorates are awarded to established academics in recognition of a substantial body of original research undertaken over the course of many years. Typically, the candidate will submit a collection of work which has been previously published in a peer-reviewed context and/or as specialist textbooks and pay an examination fee. The university then assembles a committee of academics, both internal and external, who review the work submitted and decide whether the candidate has satisfied the requirements for the award.

- Doctor of Arts (DArts)
- Doctor of Civil Law (DCL)
- Doctor of Design (DDes) (Also offered as a professional doctorate.)
- Doctor of Divinity (DD)
- Doctor of Laws (LLD)
- Doctor of Law (LLD)
- Doctor of Letters (DLitt or LittD)
- Doctor of Literature (DLit)
  - Doctor of Literature (Education) (DLit (Ed))
- Doctor of Medicine (DM) (This is more commonly a doctorate by thesis, similar to the PhD; it remains a higher doctorate formally at Oxford but an enquiry in 2016 has recommended that this be changed. Note that the first professional medical degree in the UK is the Bachelor of Medicine, Bachelor of Surgery.)
- Doctor of Medical Science (DMedSc of MedScD)
- Doctor of Dental Science (DDSc)
- Doctor of Music (DMus or MusD)
- Doctor of Science (DSc or ScD)
  - Doctor of Science (Economics) (DSc (Econ))
  - Doctor of Science (Engineering) (DSc (Eng))
  - Doctor of Science (Medicine) (DSc (Med))
  - Doctor of Science (Social Sciences) (DSc(SocSc))
- Doctor of Technology (DTech)
- Doctor of Engineering (DEng)

Higher doctorates can also be awarded as honorary degrees, but these are differentiated from the equivalent degrees earned by presenting a body of work to be reviewed.

=== Honorary doctorates ===
All levels of degree - though usually of master's level and above - can be awarded as honorary degrees. However, some universities have a degree which is only awarded honoris causa:

- Doctor of the University (DUniv)

=== No longer awarded ===
- Doctor of Canon Law (DCanL) – did not survive the Reformation.
- Doctor of Hygiene (DHy) – awarded by Durham University and subsequently by Newcastle University

== United States ==
=== Research degrees ===
The National Science Foundation recognizes the following as research degrees:

- Doctor of Arts (DA)
- Doctor of Business Administration (DBA)
- Doctor of Canon Law (JCD)
- Doctor of Design (DDes)
- Doctor of Engineering or Engineering Science (DEng, DESc, DES)
- Doctor of Education (EdD)
- Doctor of Fine Arts (DFA.)
- Doctor of Hebrew Letters (DHL)
- Doctor of Juridical Science (JSD, SJD)
- Doctor of Musical Arts (DMA)
- Doctor of Music Education (DME)
- Doctor of Modern Languages (DML)
- Doctor of Nursing Science (DNSc)
- Doctor of Nursing Practice (DNP)
- Doctor of Philosophy (PhD)
- Doctor of Public Health (DrPH)
- Doctor of Sacred Theology (STD)
- Doctor of Health Sciences (DHSc, or HScD)
- Doctor of Science (DSc, ScD)
- Doctor of Theology (Th.D.)

=== Professional degrees ===
- Doctor of Acupuncture (D.Ac., D.Acu.)
- Doctor of Acupuncture and Oriental Medicine (D.A.O.M.)
- Doctor of Anesthesia Practice (Dr.AP)
- Doctor of Applied Science (D.A.S.)
- Doctor of Architecture (D.Arch.)
- Doctor of Athletic Training (D.A.T.)
- Doctor of Audiology (Au.D)
- Doctor of Behavioral Health (D
- Doctor of Chemistry (D.Chem.)
- Doctor of Chiropractic (D.C.)
- Doctor of Church Music (D.C.M.)
- Doctor of Clinical Nutrition (D.C.N.)
- Doctor of Clinical Science in Speech-Language Pathology (CScD)
- Doctor of Comparative Law (D.C.L.)
- Doctor of Civil Law (D.C.L.)
- Doctor of Communication (DComm.)
- Doctor of Computer Science (D.C.S.)
- Doctor of Criminal Justice (D.C.J.)
- Doctor of Criminology (D.Crim.)
- Doctor of Divinity (Divinitatis Doctor) (D.D.)
- Doctor of Dental Medicine (D.M.D.)
- Doctor of Dental Surgery (D.D.S.)
- Doctor of Economic Development (D.E.D.)
- Doctor of Environmental Science and Engineering (D.Env.)
- Doctor of Forestry (D.F.)
- Doctor of Geological Science (D.G.S.)
- Doctor of Health Administration (D.H.A.)
- Doctor of Health and Safety (D.H.S.)
- Doctor of Health Education (D.H.Ed)
- Doctor of Hebrew Literature/Letters (D.H.L.)
- Doctor of Health Science (D.H.Sc., D.H.S.)
- Doctor of Hebrew Studies (D.H.S.)
- Doctor of Humane Letters (D.Hum.Litt.)
- Doctor of Industrial Technology (D.I.T.)
- Doctor of Information Technology (D.I.T.)
- Doctor of International Affairs (D.I.A.)
- Juris Doctor (J.D.)
- Doctor of Law and Policy (L.P.D., D.L.P.)
- Doctor of Liberal Studies (D.L.S.)
- Doctor of Library Science (D.L.S.)
- Doctor of Management (D.M.)
- Doctor of Medical Humanities (D.M.H.)
- Doctor of Medical Physics (D.M.P)
- Doctor of Medical Science (D.M.Sc., DMSc)
- Doctor of Medicine (M.D.)
- Doctor of Ministry (D.Min.)
- Doctor of Missiology (D.Miss)
- Doctor of Music (D.M., D.Mus.)
- Doctor of Music Therapy (D.M.T.)
- Doctor of Naprapathic Medicine (D.N.)
- Doctor of Naturopathic Medicine (N.D., N.M.D.)
- Doctor of Nursing Practice (D.N.P.)
- Doctor of Occupational Therapy (O.T.D., D.O.T.)
- Doctor of Optometry (O.D.)
- Doctor of Oriental Medicine (D.O.M., O.M.D.)
- Doctor of Osteopathic Medicine (D.O.)
- Doctor of Pastoral Counseling (D.PC)
- Doctor of Professional Counseling (D.P.C.)
- Doctor of Pastoral Music (D.P.M.)
- Doctor of Pharmacy (Pharm.D.)
- Doctor of Physical Education (D.P.E.)
- Doctor of Physical Therapy (D.P.T.s)
- Doctor of Podiatric Medicine (D.P.M.)
- Doctor of Practical Theology (D.P.T., D.Th.P.)
- Doctor of Professional Studies (D.P.S.)
- Doctor of Psychology (Psy.D)
- Doctor of Public Administration (D.P.A.)
- Doctor of Rehabilitation (Rh.D.)
- Doctor of Sacred Music (D.S.M.)
- Doctor of Science in Dentistry (D.Sc.D.)
- Doctor of Science in Veterinary Medicine (D.Sc.V.M.)
- Doctor of the Science of Law (J.S.D.)
- Doctor of Social Science (D.S.Sc.)
- Doctor of Social Work (D.S.W.)
- Doctor of Transformational Leadership (D.T.L.)
- Doctor of Veterinary Medicine (D.V.M.)
- Doctor of Worship Studies (D.W.S)

== See also ==
- List of honorary degrees
- Doctor (title)#Worldwide usage
- Doctorate#National variations
- Doctor of Philosophy#Degrees around the globe
