= Terminal degree =

Highest degree that can be awarded in a field

A terminal degree is the highest-level university degree that can be achieved and awarded in an academic discipline or professional field. The term terminal degree is also used to refer to a degree that is awarded because a doctoral-level degree is not available or appropriate. The two main types of terminal degrees are academic or professional.

An academic doctorate, such as the Doctor of Philosophy (PhD), is a terminal degree for expanding human knowledge through research and dissertation defense. A professional doctorate is a terminal degree for licensure in an occupation, such as the Doctor of Medicine (MD), Doctor of Osteopathic Medicine (DO), Juris Doctor (JD), and Doctor of Engineering (EngD).

The phrase "terminal degree" is used heavily in the United States but is less used in other countries. The term is not generally used in the United Kingdom or Canada, for example, and its exact meaning varies somewhat between those areas and disciplines in which the term is used. In some countries, there are degrees that are more advanced than the PhD, such as the higher doctorates in the United Kingdom and Russia and the habilitation degree awarded in Germany and Austria.

Not all terminal degrees are doctorates. For example, in professional practice fields, there are often terminal master-level degrees, some of which are called doctorates, e.g., MEng (Master of Engineering), MLArch, standing for Master Landscape Architect, or BEng for Engineers, MB (Bachelor of Medicine, which is used in the UK). Architecture was a discipline where the M.Arch was considered terminal as a professionally oriented degree, but a Doctor of Architecture (D.Arch) that is recognized by the National Architectural Accrediting Board (NAAB) establishes the doctoral level as the highest level of "professional degree" in architecture in the United States. For the same discipline of Architecture, the "Laurea di Dottore" is the terminal degree in Italy. Interior design and Interior Architecture have terminal master-level degrees, such as MID, MA, MS interior design education. Most non-doctoral degrees are not terminal in academic terms except the Master of Fine Arts (MFA), an academically-recognized terminal degree given to practitioners in the fine arts and performing arts. The Master of Business Administration (MBA) is also considered a terminal professional degree.

== Research degrees ==
In academic fields, the typical terminal degree is that of Doctor of Philosophy, but others also exist. The first phase of the Ph.D. consists of coursework in the student's field of study and requires one to three years to complete. This is often followed by a preliminary or comprehensive examination and/or a series of cumulative examinations, emphasizing breadth rather than depth of knowledge. Finally, another two to four years is usually required for the composition of a substantial and original contribution to human knowledge embodied in a written dissertation that in the social sciences and humanities is typically 250 to 450 pages in length. Dissertations generally consist of (i) a comprehensive literature review, (ii) an outline of methodology, and (iii) several chapters of scientific, social, historical, philosophical, or literary analysis. Typically, upon completion, the candidate undergoes an oral examination, sometimes public, by his or her supervisory committee with expertise in the given discipline.

=== Typical professional degrees, professional/clinical doctorates, and research doctorates ===
- Arts:
  - Doctor of Arts (DA)
  - Doctor of Music (DM or DMus)
  - Doctor of Musical Arts (DMA) (Usually awarded to performance majors in the musical arts)
  - Doctor of Modern Languages (DML)
  - Doctor of Philosophy (PhD or DPhil)
  - Doctor of Professional Studies (DPS)
  - Master of Fine Arts (MFA)
  - Master of Arts (MA)
- Design:
  - Master of Art and Design (MAD)
  - Master of Architecture (MArch)
  - Doctor of Architecture (DArch)
  - Doctor of Design (DDes)
  - Master of Design (MDes)
  - Master of Landscape Architecture (MLArch and/or MLA)
  - Master of City Planning (MPLAN, MCRP, MUP, MCP, MCD or MURP)
  - Master of Fine Arts (MFA)
  - Master of Graphic Design (MGraph)
- Education:
  - Doctor of Education (Ed.D.)
  - Educational Specialist (EdS)
- Healthcare:
  - Doctor of Acupuncture and Oriental Medicine (DAOM)
  - Doctor of Athletic Training (DAT)
  - Doctor of Audiology (AuD)
  - Doctor of Behavioral Health (DBH)
  - Doctor of Chiropractic (DC)
  - Doctor of Clinical Nutrition (DCN)
  - Doctor of Dental Surgery or Doctor of Dental Medicine (DDS or DMD)
  - Doctor of Healthcare Administration (DHA)
  - Doctor of Health Science (DHS, DHSc)
  - Doctor of Medicine (MD)
  - Doctor of Medical Physics (DMP)
  - Doctor of Medical Science (DMSc)
  - Doctor of Nurse Anesthesia Practice (DNAP)
  - Doctor of Nursing Practice (DNP)
  - Doctor of Occupational Therapy (DOT or OTD)
  - Doctor of Optometry (OD)
  - Doctor of Osteopathy (DO)
  - Doctor of Pharmacy (PharmD)
  - Doctor of Physical Therapy or Physiotherapy (DPT or DPhysio)
  - Doctor of Podiatric Medicine (DPM)
  - Doctor of Psychology (PsyD)
  - Doctor of Public Health (DrPH, DPH)
  - Doctor of Science (DSc)
  - Doctor of Social Science (DSocSci)
  - Doctor of Social Work (DSW)
  - Doctor of Veterinary Medicine (DVM)
- Law:
  - Doctor of Canon Law (JCD)
  - Juris Doctor or Doctor of Jurisprudence (JD)
  - Doctor of Juridical Science (JSD/SJD) (in the United States)
  - Doctor of Laws (LLD)
- Management:
  - Doctor of Business Administration (DBA, DrBA)
  - Doctor of Management (DMgt, DM)
  - Master of Public Affairs (MPA)
  - Master of Project Management (MPM)
  - Doctor of Public Administration (DPA)
  - Doctor of Economic Development (DED)
- Religion:
  - Master of Divinity (MDiv)
  - Doctor of Divinity (DD or DDiv)
  - Doctor of Ministry (DMin)
  - Master of Theology (ThM)
  - Master of Sacred Theology (STM)
  - Doctor of Sacred Theology (STD)
  - Doctor of Philosophy (PhD or DPhil)
  - Doctor of Theology (ThD or DTh)
- Science and Engineering:
  - Doctor rerum naturalium (Dr. rer. nat.)
  - Doctor of Computer Science (DSc.Comp, DCS, DCSc)
  - Doctor of Engineering (Dr.-Ing./DEng/Dr. Eng./EngD)
  - Doctor of Science (ScD, DSc, SD, or DS)
- Social Science:
  - Doctor of Criminal Justice (DCJ)
- Technology:
  - Doctor of Information Technology (DIT)
  - Master of Library and Information Science (MLIS, MLS, MSLS) (Given in the US, by an ALA-accredited school or program.)

== Professional degrees ==
A professional degree is a degree that is required, often by law, as in the case of medical and other clinical professions, that must be earned first before the holder of the degree can practice in the profession. A speech-language pathologist, for example, must hold a master's degree in communicative disorders: speech-language pathology to practice. However, an actor does not need a degree to act, even though there are degrees for acting available. In some fields, especially those linked to a profession (such as medicine, law, or teaching), a distinction is to be drawn between a professional degree, an advanced degree, and a terminal degree. A first professional degree is generally required by law or custom to practice the profession without limitation. An advanced professional degree provides further training in a specialized area of the profession. A first professional degree is an academic degree designed to prepare the holder for a particular career or profession, fields in which scholarly research and academic activity are not the profession, but rather the practice of the profession. In many cases, such as law, medicine, and teaching, the first professional degree is also terminal, usually because no further advanced degree is required for practice in that field, even though more advanced academic degrees may exist.

=== Typical professional degree ===
- Business:
  - Accountant (MAcc, MAcy, MSAcy)
  - Business Administration (DBA)
  - Business Administration (MBA)
- Design:
  - Architect (B.Arch, M.Arch, D.Arch)
  - Architectural Engineer (B.A.E, M.A.E)
  - Landscape Architect (BLA, MLA)
  - Urban Planning (MPLAN, MCRP, MUP, MCP, MCD, MURP)
  - Interior Design, Interior Architecture (BS, BFA, MFA, MID, MA, MS)
- Education or a bachelor's degree usable for teaching (BEd, BA, BME, BSE, BSocSc, BSc)
- Engineer (BE, BEng, MEng, BSE, BScEng, BASc)
- Healthcare:
  - Acupuncturist (MAcOM, DAcOM)
  - Advanced Practice Nurse (DNP, DNAP, DNS, DNSc)
  - Audiologist (MS, AuD)
  - Chiropractor (DC)
  - Health Administrator (MHA)
  - School Counselor (M.A., M.S., M.Ed., M.Coun. [also M.C.], or Ph.D.)
  - Mental Health Counselor (M.A., M.S., M.Ed., M.Coun. [also M.C.], or Ph.D.)
  - Medical Laboratory Scientist (MLS, CLS, MT)
  - Dentist (DMD, BDent, DDS, BDS, BDSc, BChD, CD, Cand.Odont., Dr.Med.Dent.)
  - Midwife (BMid, BScMid)
  - Nurse (BSN, MSN)
  - Occupational Therapist (OTD, DrOT, MSOT, MA, MOT)
  - Optometrist (OD, B.Optom)
  - Pharmacist (BPharm, BScPhm, PharmB, MPharm, Pharm.D.)
  - Physical Therapist (DPT, DPhysio, MPT, MSPT, MPhysio, BSPT, BPT, BPhysio)
  - Physician or Surgeon (M.D., D.O., MBBS, MDCM, MBChB, BMed, Dr.Med, Dr.MuD, Cand.med).
  - Physician Associate (MPAS, MPS, MS, PGDip)
  - Podiatrist (DPM, DP, PodD, BPod, PodB)
  - Psychologist (PhD, PsyD, ClinPsyD or EdS)
  - Public Health (MPH)
  - Radiation Therapist (BSc, BRad)
  - Radiographer (BSc, BMRSc, BRad)
  - Respiratory Therapist (MSRC, BSRT)
  - Scientist (BSc, BS)
  - Social Worker (BSW, BA, BSc)
  - Speech and Language Therapist (MA, MS)
  - Veterinarian (DVM, VMD, BVS, BVSc, BVMS)
- Lawyer (LL.B., J.D.)
- Minister (M.Div.)

=== Advanced professional degrees ===
- Education (MEd, MAT, MT, EdS)
- Engineering (MEng, MASc, MMSc, PD)
- Healthcare:
  - Acupuncture (DAcOM)
  - Advanced Practice Registered Nurse (APRN: CRNA, NP, CNM, CNS) (DNP, DNAP, DNS, DNSc)
  - Biotechnology (ALM)
  - Dental Science (DDSc, Dr.Odont) (advanced degree in countries that award a bachelor's degree in dental surgery as a first professional degree, usually awarded for outstanding research in a particular field of Dentistry)
  - Dentistry (MDS, MSD, MDSc, or DClinDent) (these are usually granted at the culmination of a specialty training program in dentistry in those programs that also require research and a thesis to be completed)
  - Medicine (MD/DO) (advanced degree in countries that award a bachelor's degree in medicine or surgery as a first professional degree, usually awarded for outstanding research in a particular field of Medicine)
  - Midwifery (MMid, MScMid)
  - Nursing Practice (DNP)
  - Surgery (MS, MSurg, MCh, ChM, or MChir) (Usually granted after completion of a surgery training program in conjunction with a research thesis)
  - Physician Associate (DMSc)
  - Psychology (PsyD)
  - Social Science (PhD, DPhil)
  - Social Work (MSW, DSW, ProfD or PhD)
- Lawyer (LLM, JSD, PhD)
- Ministry (DMin)
- Public Policy (MPP)
- Public Administration (MPA)

== See also ==
- Professional degree
- Professional school
