= Academic staff =

Educational occupation

Academic staff, also known as faculty (in North American usage) or academics (in British, Australian, and New Zealand usage), are vague terms that describe teachers or research staff of a school, college, university or research institute.

In British and Australian/New Zealand English, "faculty" usually refers to a sub-division of a university (usually the teaching/research staff of one or a group of departments).

In contrast, in North America "faculty" refers to the people who teach and research, and is distinguished from "staff", who are hired in administrative, operations, and support roles. For example the Faculty Handbook at Boston University defines faculty as Assistant, Associate, and Full Professors, those with professorial titles modified by “Research,” “Clinical,” and “of the Practice, Lecturers of all ranks, and Instructors.

In the United States and parts of Canada, universities, community colleges and even some secondary and primary schools use the term faculty. Other institutions (e.g., teaching hospitals or not-for-profit research institutes) may likewise use the term faculty. In parts of the US, the term academic staff can be synonymous with just staff, which instead refers to staff that is not primarily involved with teaching or research.

The higher education regulatory body of India, University Grants Commission, defines academic staff as teachers, librarians, and physical education personnel.

In countries like the Philippines, faculty is used more broadly to refer to teaching staff of either a basic or higher education institution.

== Overview ==
In many universities, the members of the administration (e.g., department chairs, deans, vice presidents, presidents, and librarians) are also faculty members; many of them begin (and remain) as professors. At some universities, the distinction between "academic faculty" and "administrative faculty" is made explicit by the former being contracted for nine months per year, meaning that they can devote their time to research (and possibly be absent from the campus) during the summer months, while the latter are contracted for twelve months per year. These two types of faculty members are sometimes known as "nine-month faculty" and "twelve-month faculty". Faculty who are paid a nine-month salary are typically allowed to seek external funds from grant agencies to partially or fully support their research activities during the summer months.

Librarians are a special case in that they are educators like faculty who belong to degree granting departments, not necessarily administrators who have management responsibilities like Deans, Presidents, and Vice Presidents.

Most university faculty members hold a Ph.D. or equivalent highest-level degree in their field. Some professionals or instructors from other institutions who are associated with a particular university (e.g., by teaching some courses or supervising graduate students) but do not hold professorships may be appointed as adjunct faculty.

In North America, faculty is a distinct category from staff, although members of both groups are employees of the institution in question. This is distinct from, for example, the British (and European, Australia, and New Zealand) usage, in which all employees of the institution are staff either on academic or professional (i.e. non-academic) contracts.

== See also ==
- Professor
- List of academic ranks
- Tenure
