= Magister degree =

Academic degree in higher education

A magister degree (also magistar, female form: magistra; from Latin: magister, "teacher") is an academic degree used in various systems of higher education.

The magister degree arose in medieval universities in Europe and was originally equal to the doctorate; while the doctorate was originally conferred in theology, law and medicine, the magister degree was usually conferred in the liberal arts, broadly known as "philosophy" in continental Europe, which encompassed all other academic subjects. In some countries, the title has retained this original meaning until the modern age, while in other countries, magister has become the title of a lower degree, in some cases parallel with a master's degree (whose name is cognate).

== Argentina ==
In Argentina, the Master of Science or Magister (Mg, Ma, Mag, MSc) is a postgraduate degree of two to four years of duration by depending on each university's statutes. The admission to a Master program (Spanish: Maestría) in an Argentine University requires the full completion of a Bachelor's degree, as well Licentiate's degree as Professorate degree of four to five years duration from any recognized university. Under the accomplishment of the Magister Scientiæ thesis dissertation, that in years of formal education, is generally equivalent to a Ph.D. or Doctorate in universities of North America or Europe given the Bologna comparison system among academic programs.

== Egypt ==
In Egypt, Magister degree is a postgraduate degree which is awarded after three to six years duration. It is equivalent to an MSc degree. It is a prerequisite to have an MSc before applying to a Ph.D. or Doctorate degrees.

== Algeria ==
In Algeria, Magister degree is a postgraduate degree that is awarded after at least three years duration. Unlike in Egypt, the Magister degree in Algeria is not equivalent to an MSc but it is a superior degree. It is a prerequisite to have a Magister before applying to Es Sciences Doctorate degree.

== German-speaking Europe and other parts of Central and Eastern Europe ==
In German-speaking Europe and other European countries culturally influenced by it the Magister's degree was originally equal to the doctorate; in German-speaking institutions the "doctorate" gradually replaced the earlier title of Magister, and it became the only recognized degree for the completion of a course of study in the faculty of arts or philosophy."

After the classical Magister's degree had been replaced by the doctorate in the faculties of arts or philosophy, the word magister has in modern times mostly been used for an advanced degree below the doctorate, that is equal to a master's degree under the Bologna process.

In Austria, Bulgaria, Poland, Romania, the Czech Republic, Germany, Ukraine, Latvia, Lithuania and Slovakia, obtaining the Magister requires at least five years of study including coursework and a final thesis, similar to a Diplom degree. Magisters tend to be awarded in the humanities and the social sciences, while Diplomas dominate in the natural sciences and in engineering.

In Austria, universities have partitioned almost all their previous Magister programs into a three- or four-year Bachelor's and two-year Master's program, following the cycle structure of the Bologna Process.

In Poland magister (abbreviated mgr or mgr inż. for degrees in technical disciplines) is awarded after five years of university-level education and it is an equivalent to Master of Arts, Master of Science, Master of Laws, Master of Music in an academic discipline. Before around 1999 and the implementation of the Bologna Process the first academic degree awarded in Poland was magister. After implementation of the Bologna Process the person who obtained a Licentiate degree can continue education to the magister level (it requires additional two years of studies).

== Denmark and Norway ==
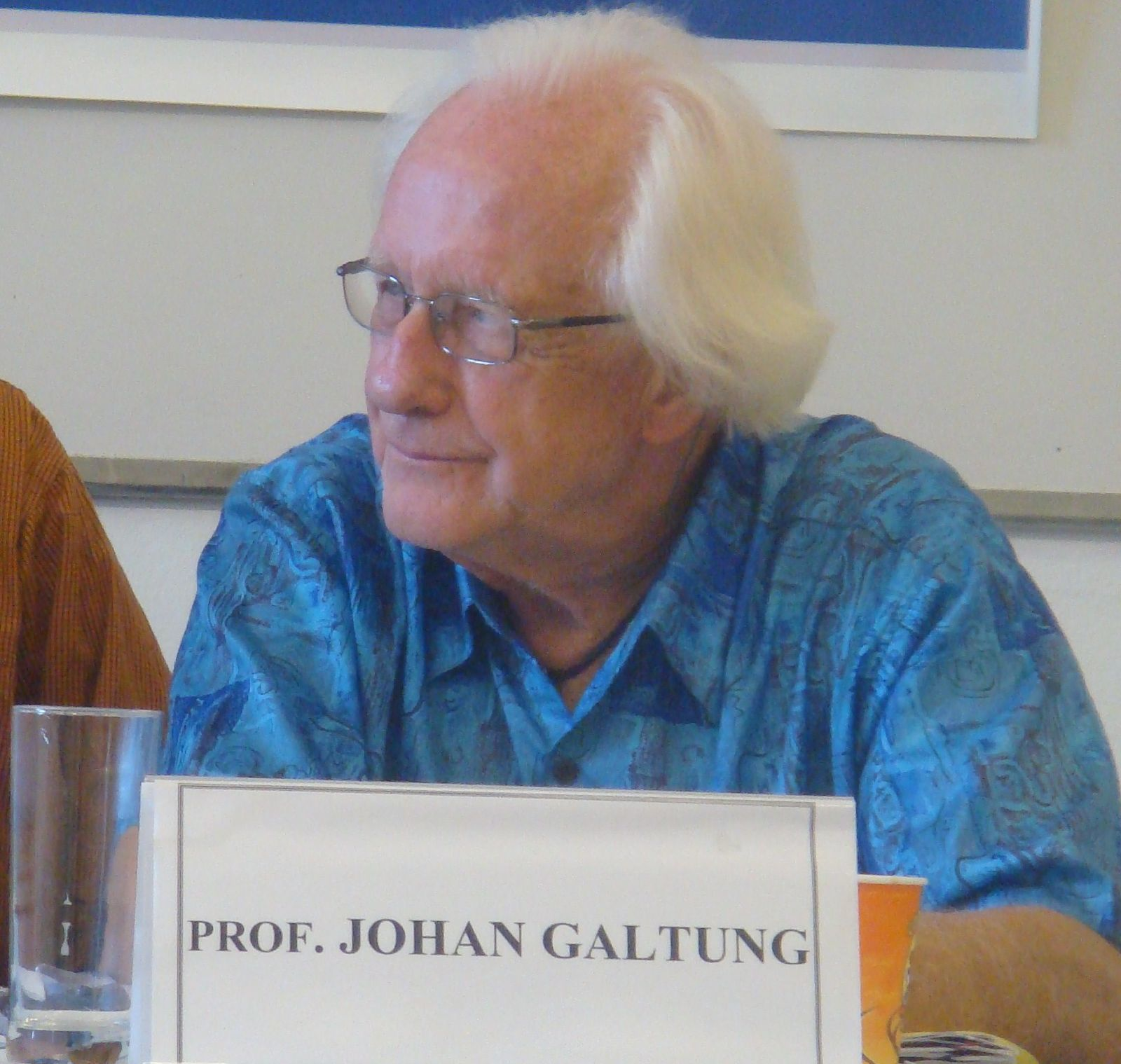
Johan Galtung, the principal founder of the discipline of peace and conflict studies, holds a mag.art. degree as his highest degree, translated into English as a PhD.

In Denmark and Norway, the Magister's degree was formerly an advanced research degree used in certain fields, that was equivalent to the PhD in English-speaking countries. It was usually translated as a PhD in an English language context and was replaced by PhD degrees in the 1990s and 2000s. The Magister's degree in Denmark and Norway was based on the classical Magister's degree also found in other European countries, that was equal to the doctorate. The Magister's degree was, and to some extent still is, commonly the terminal degree held by academics in the new sciences, that is the humanities, natural sciences and social sciences; it was not used in the traditional "higher faculties" of theology, law and medicine in the modern era.

In Norway, the Magister's degree in the 20th century required 7–8 years of studies, with strong emphasis on the scientific dissertation, which eventually had a formal standardized scope of 3 years; the degree required a first degree such as a cand.mag. (4–5 years of studies) or equivalent, an independent scientific work with a dissertation workload corresponding to three years of full-time research and dissertation work, and a public trial lecture. As such it was a research-only degree. The dissertation was evaluated by a committee; the purpose of the trial lecture, a requirement the degree shared only with the doctoral and licentiate's degrees, was to demonstrate the candidate's suitability for permanent (tenured) academic positions at university-level. Like doctoral and licentiate's dissertations, magister's dissertations did not receive grades, but all approved dissertations were ipso facto regarded as "laudable" (the highest grade, equal to A in the ECTS grading scale). The degree of magister qualified for positions as assistant or associate professor, and many went on to become full professors without obtaining further degrees.

The Magister's degree became increasingly rare from the 1970s, and as a result of Denmark and Norway implementing the Bologna Process, it has now been completely abolished and replaced by PhD degrees. In Norway, the formal requirements for equivalence with the modern PhD are "a standardized scope of at least 3 years of study" and "an independent scientific work" with a thesis workload corresponding to "at least two years of standardized full time study," which is one year less than the requirements for the Magister's degree.

Two main forms of the Magister's degree existed: Mag. art. (abbreviation of the Latin Magister Artium, "teacher of the arts"), if the degree was earned in humanities or social sciences, and mag. scient. for Natural Science. In Denmark, there was also a third degree in sociology, mag. scient. soc. The mag. scient. degree was discontinued in the 1970s and the mag. art. degree programs in Denmark ceased immatriculating students in 2007, but the degree was rarely used since the 1990s. In Norway it was abolished some years earlier, having become an increasingly rare, but highly regarded, degree, especially after the 1970s.

The degree was introduced in Denmark–Norway in 1479, as the highest degree at the Faculty of Philosophy, and was equivalent to the doctoral degrees in theology, law and medicine. It was replaced by the Doctor Philosophiae degree as the highest degree at the Faculty of Philosophy in both countries in 1824. In 1848, the Magister's degree was reintroduced in Denmark, as a degree above the candidate's degree. The new Magister's degree was originally formally known as Magisterkonferens, "Magister Counselor". The program was designed to be preparation for finding employment as a researcher. Sometimes the degree was obtained after the candidate's degree had been obtained. The Magister's degrees, directly based on the Danish ones, were introduced in Norway in 1921. In 1955, the Licentiate's degrees were also introduced at the University of Oslo Faculty of Law, and were occasionally awarded until 2003.

A Norwegian Magister's degree required a three-year scientific dissertation of high quality, and is considered "approximately equivalent to an American Ph.D." Also in Denmark the Magister's degree is considered a degree at the same level as a PhD. By comparison, in both Norway and Denmark, a PhD degree today only requires a 2.5-year dissertation. The Danish and Norwegian PhD degrees are identical, but in Denmark, the PhD is not considered a doctorate, as is established by law.

Both American PhDs and German doctorates have been found to be equivalent to Danish and Norwegian Magister's degrees on several occasions. In Denmark, the PhD degree has been introduced as a so-called "lower doctorate" (although it is not a doctorate in the legal sense), formally replacing the Licentiate's degree and thus also the Magister's degree. Those obtaining the traditional doctorates in Denmark, now called higher doctorates, are well-established academics, overwhelmingly at the associate or full professor level, and this was also traditionally the situation in Norway. In Norway, however, the earlier Magister's degree and the formal doctorates, which are now roughly similar to the Magister's degree in extent, are now equivalent, as Norway unlike Denmark does not draw a distinction between the PhD (with its predecessors, the Licentiate's and Magister's degrees) and the doctorates.

The Danish and Norwegian Magister's degree should not be confused with the cand.mag. (candidatus magisterii), which corresponds to an American Master of Arts.

== Sweden ==
The title magister has had many different meanings in the Swedish educational system, from a degree equal to the doctorate to a graduate degree.

Since 2007 in Sweden, the Magister Examination (Swedish: magisterexamen) is a one-year graduate degree which requires at least three years of undergraduate studies. It is officially translated into either Master of Arts, Master of Social Science or Master of Science depending on the subject.

In Sweden, Magister (filosofie magister) historically was the highest degree at the faculties of philosophy and was equivalent to the doctorate used in theology, law and medicine. The degree was abolished in 1863, and replaced with the Doctor of Philosophy. The magister degrees used in Denmark and Norway most closely resemble this degree.

Magister has since referred to several degrees in Sweden which are unrelated to the original magister degree and unrelated to the Magister degrees in the other Scandinavian countries. Some universities conferred a degree called Magister between 1908 and 1969, which was roughly comparable to a Master's degree.

This Master's degree was traditionally taken as a first degree before the Bologna Process. The degree usually lasted about 5–6 years and is structured into Basic, Intermediate, and Advanced progressional components. A new Magister degree awarded at the completion of undergraduate studies, requiring at least four years of studies, was introduced in 1993. Since the introduction of the Bologna Process in 2005, the Magister has been broken into Bachelor (formerly Basic/Intermediate) and Master (formerly Advanced) components. However, the vast majority of students continue right through to complete the Master's degree and, in effect, the duration and extent of the old Magister degree remains much as it was.

== Former Yugoslavia ==
In Slovenia, Bosnia and Herzegovina, Serbia, Croatia, Montenegro, North Macedonia and other territories once part of Yugoslavia, before the implementation of the Bologna Process, the magistar nauka/magister znanosti (Magister of Science) was a research-oriented degree awarded for two or three years of study following the diploma degree (which lasted 4 to 6 years) and the defense of a magistarski rad (Magister's thesis). In order to be promoted to doktor nauka/znanosti (Doctor of Science), a magistar was supposed to write and defend a doctoral thesis. Magistar um(j)etnosti (Magister of Arts) was a terminal degree in music performance, acting and visual arts.

In Serbia, by decision of the Serbian Parliament (Odredba stava 2.), the status of those graduated before the Bologna process is now equivalent with Master's degree graduates in the EU. Magister's degree has been considered as equivalent of the first two years of three years doctoral studies. In Croatia, the statuses are regulated by a new law from 2007 and a new classification from 2008.

Entering 'Magistar" studies was a highly selective process. Only students with high GPA were eligible for studies of this kind. Mostly, those were preselected students who were employed at universities.

This kind of degree entitles one to be considered as PhD candidate. He or she can immediately start working on a dissertation. The person with this kind of degree completed overall 4 + 3 years of education (humanities, science etc.) or 5 + 3 (engineering) years of education after high school. Two years were related to the coursework only. After two years of coursework and research, the thesis was completed in a year or two after the coursework, although it roughly depended on a workload of an average graduate student who is considered to be a faculty member with teaching responsibilities (which can be up to 16 hours per week of a teaching load).

After the Bologna process, previous undergraduate education has been reformed. Current students that are in a 3- or 4-year Bachelor program and 1–2 Master program have to complete PhD requirements before writing their dissertation. They have to complete the coursework and pass preliminary exams. Students with Magistar degree have no such requirements. They have to do the research only related to the dissertation. Some universities which retained the Magistar (e.g. University of Zagreb) use it as a pre-postgraduate studies qualification.

== France ==
In France, a magistère is a highly selective three-year course. To enter the course, the student is required to obtain top-level grades at his Diplôme d'études universitaires générales (two-year first university degree). However, due to the Bologna Process, most of the magistères are substituted by Master's degrees.

The most prestigious French universities still offer "magistères" in Law, Economics, or Sciences, which are open to the highest-ranked students at the end of the first two years of studies.

== Italy ==
After the Bologna Process the second cycle degree in Italy is the Laurea Magistrale, i.e. a Magister degree. It is a postgraduate two-year degree, equivalent to a Master's degree.

In some fields (particularly, Law, Medicine, Pharmacy and Architecture) the Laurea magistrale a ciclo unico is awarded. This is a five or six year second cycle (Master's) degree, which does not require a previous first cycle degree for the admission.

== English-speaking regions ==
There are various traditional master's degrees (especially those that predate the 20th century) whose English-language names (containing Master) have Neo-Latin counterparts (containing Magister). These are used, among others, by the universities of Oxford and Cambridge, in some official ceremonies still conducted in Latin, such as the awarding of degrees. They include the following:

English	Neo-Latin
Master of Arts	Magister Artium
Master of Advanced Study	Magister in Studio Ampliore
Master of Divinity	Magister Divinitatis
Master of Education	Magister Educationis
Master of Laws	Legum Magister
Master of Letters	Magister Litterarum
Master of Liberal Arts	Magister Liberalium Artium
Master of Pharmacy	Magister Pharmaciae
Master of Philosophy	Magister Philosophiae
Master of Research	Magister in Arte Investegante
Master of Sacred Theology	Sacrae Theologiae Magister
Master of Science	Magister Scientiae
Master of Surgery	Magister Chirurgiae
Master of Theology	Theologiae Magister
