= Doktoringenieur =

German engineering doctorate

The Doktoringenieur or Doktor-Ingenieur (acronym Dr.-Ing., also Doktor der Ingenieurwissenschaften) is the German Doctor of Engineering degree, comparable to the Doctor of Science (Engineering), Doctor of Science (Technology) or a PhD in Engineering or Architecture.

It was first introduced in 1899, in the context of the centenary of the Technische Hochschule Charlottenburg (now Technische Universität Berlin), at the Prussian Technische Hochschule. The other German states adopted it in the following years. In contrast to the other historic doctoral degrees (e.g. Dr. phil., Dr. iur. or Dr. med.), the Doktoringenieur was not titled in Latin but German, and therefore written with a hyphen (Dr.-Ing.).

In the field of mathematics, computer science and natural sciences, some universities offer the choice between Dr.-Ing. and Dr. rer. nat. based on the primary focus of the dissertation. If the contributions focus slightly more on applied scientific engineering a Dr.-Ing. is given, while a Dr. rer. nat. is preferred if the dissertation contains more theoretical scientific contributions. A German doctorate is usually a research doctorate and is awarded in the context of the so-called Promotion that also requires a dissertation.

It should not be confused with a Dutch double title dr. ing., indicating that one holds both a research doctorate (dr.) from a university and an engineer's degree (ing.) from a Dutch polytechnic (i.e. Hogeschool).

== See also ==
- Dr. rer. nat.
