= Doctor of Canon Law =

Catholic doctoral-level terminal degree

Doctor of Canon Law (Latin: Juris Canonici Doctor, JCD) is the doctoral-level terminal degree in the studies of canon law of the Roman Catholic Church. It can also be an honorary degree awarded by Anglican colleges. It may also be abbreviated ICD or dr.iur.can. (Iuris Canonici Doctor), ICDr, DCL, DCnl, DDC, or DCanL (Doctor of Canon Law). A doctor of both laws (i.e. canon and civil) is a JUD (Juris Utriusque Doctor) or UJD (Utriusque Juris Doctor).

== History ==
The Roman Church has the oldest continuously used homogeneous legal system in the world.
