= Doctor of Criminal Justice =

Doctoral degree in criminal justice

The Doctor of Criminal Justice (D.C.J.) is a doctoral degree in the field of criminal justice. As a terminal degree, it prepares the holder for administrative, research, academic or professional positions in the criminal justice field at both public and private institutions.

== History ==
The Doctor of Criminal Justice was first identified as a type of research doctorate by the National Science Foundation in its 1996 Survey of Earned Doctorates. With no respondents, the credential disappeared from subsequent surveys. The Doctor of Criminal Justice degree finally materialized in 2017. There are several regionally accredited Doctor of Criminal Justice degree programs in the United States. The first in the United States was approved for launch in 2017 at the California University of Pennsylvania, now Pennsylvania Western University accredited by the Middle States Commission on Higher Education In 2018, Saint Leo University launched the second available Doctor of Criminal Justice program, accredited by the Southern Association of Colleges and Schools with concentrations in Homeland Security, Human Services or Education. Northcentral University also launched a Doctor of Criminal Justice program in 2018, accredited by the Western Association of Schools and Colleges and now National University. Liberty University is now offering the Doctor of Criminal Justice degree program with concentrations in Homeland Security or Leadership, alongside its PhD in criminal justice. Liberty University is accredited by the [Southern Association of Colleges and Schools]. Similarly, Keiser University offers the D.C.J. program, along with the traditional Ph.D. in Criminal Justice and Criminology, which is accredited by [Southern Association of Colleges and Schools]. Moreover, in 2025, Tiffin University offers a Doctorate in Criminal Justice online with concentrations in Leadership & Administration, Forensic Psychology, or Teaching Criminal Justice in Higher Education. https://go.tiffin.edu/doctorate-programs/doctorate-in-criminal-justice/. Likewise, Arizona State University is offering in the Fall of 2025 a Doctor of Criminal Justice professional degree. https://ccj.asu.edu/masters-degrees-phds/majorinfo/PPCRIMJDCJ/graduate/false/20846

Internationally, Teesside University in the United Kingdom also offers a fully online Doctorate in Criminal Justice, providing a global opportunity for professionals seeking to advance theory and practice. The program enables students to conduct self-directed, doctoral-level research in specialized areas of criminal justice while remaining professionally active. Delivered 100% online, Teesside’s D.C.J. emphasizes independent research, applied methodology, and critical evaluation of practice. Students are expected to possess a relevant master’s degree (or 60 credits at Level 7) earned within the last five years and a minimum of two years of professional or volunteer experience in the field. Coursework includes advanced study and research modules such as Criminal Justice Research: From Planning to Practice, Piloting Your Research, and Theory into Practice in Criminal Justice.

As a relatively new type of doctorate, specific requirements for the Doctor of Criminal Justice vary. For example, the Pennsylvania Western University's Doctor of Criminal Justice can be completed with an accelerated two years of coursework (42 credits beyond master's or Juris Doctor) with an extensive written professional dissertation, defense, and comprehensive exam. Saint Leo University's Doctor of Criminal Justice program takes three and a half years to complete, and also includes a written dissertation and defense, bringing the first two D.C.J. degrees closer to the notion of research-based degrees.

== Comparisons of the D.C.J. with other related doctorates in the United States ==
Comparison to Ph.D. Compared to a Doctor of Philosophy (Ph.D.) in Criminal Justice/Criminology which is focused on theoretical research, the D.C.J. is primarily a professional, applied degree for practitioners in the criminal justice field. In this sense, it is comparable to other research-based professional doctorates, such as the Doctor of Education (Ed.D.), Doctor of Business Administration (D.B.A.), and Doctor of Psychology (Psy.D.) degrees. In theory, the two degrees are expected to constitute overlapping but distinct categories, where the D.C.J. is a degree that prepares criminal justice practitioners who can solve problems using existing knowledge, and the PhD is the more theoretical of the two as a traditional social science research degree that prepares students for careers as scholars and academics, often from a particular disciplinary perspective.

Comparison to D.Crim. and Crim.D. Another related degree identified by the National Science Foundation in 1996 is the Doctor of Criminology (D.Crim.). The D.Crim. designation has not historically been used in the United States, and its use is not well-established elsewhere. For example, there is evidence to suggest that the D.Crim. term is sometimes used interchangeably with the Ph.D.

In practice, it is more likely that a theoretical D.Crim. or Crim.D. naming convention could be used interchangeably with the D.C.J than the Ph.D. The fields of criminology and criminal justice overlap heavily. Applying knowledge from the field of criminology in a practical context generally happens within the field of criminal justice. Therefore, D.C.J and Crim.D. degrees, in theory, would be functionally identical.
