= Doctor of Governance =

In the Republic of Ireland, a Doctor of Governance (DGov) is a doctoral degree consisting of both intensive research and taught elements over a four-year period and is almost always related to corporate governance, regulation and compliance, policy making, supranational governance, globalisation or politics in general. Usually, those undertaking a DGov will have been working at a high-ranking level in the civil or public service for a number of years. Often the degree is offer in collaboration between universities in two or more jurisdictions on an international basis.

== Example Coursework ==
- The Changing Role of the Nation State
- Modernization: Government and Democracy
- The Internationalization of Legal Frameworks
- Citizenship and Legitimacy
- Economics and Governance
- Evaluation and Governance
