= Academic ranks in Denmark =

Academic ranks in Denmark are the positions and titles of professors, researchers, and administrative personnel held in academia at Danish institutions, and the relations between them.

The titles (MA, ph.d., dr.) are different from any position that a person may have, but some positions will require certain qualifications corresponding to a title. The positions are regulated through a consolidated act from the Ministry of Higher Education and Science.

== Overview ==
Academic positions at the level of Professor:

- Professor (professor)
- Forskningsprofessor (research professor)

Academic positions at the level of Associate Professor:

- Lektor (Associate Professor), time traditionally divided as 50-40-10 between teaching, research, and administration
- Seniorforsker (Senior Researcher)

Academic positions at the level of Assistant Professor:

- Post doc (Post-doc), generally a research position without the possibility of teaching
- Adjunkt (Assistant Professor), usually almost the same teaching/research/administration division as lektor, although sometimes a little more time for research
- Forsker (Researcher)

Academic positions below the level of Assistant Professor:

- Ph.d.-studerende (PhD Student or PhD Fellow)
- Videnskabelig assistent (Research Assistant)
- Undervisningsassistent (Assistant Lecturer)
- Ekstern lektor (Part-time Lecturer), requires a master's degree in the subject taught, but not a research degree (PhD or equivalent)

Special positions:

- Seniorrådgiver (Senior Adviser), the main tasks being research-based consulting to authorities and the dissemination of research results to authorities, business and society in general.
- Studielektor (Teaching Associate Professor), full time teachers without research requirement.
- Clinical Professor (for a leading attending/consultant) and Associate Clinical Professor (for an attending/consultant) are also in use. The latter two will typically require a certain amount of time with patients. Used by both doctors, dentists and chiropractors at Danish universities.

Administrative positions:

- Rektor (rector)
- Prorektor, second-ranked official of governance, deputy rector.
- Dekan (dean), head of a faculty (humanities, natural sciences, etc.)
- Institutleder (head of department), head of department (computer science, mathematics, etc.)
- Studieleder (programme director), head of a study programme (business administration, civil engineering, etc.)

== Professorship ==
In Denmark the word professor is only used for full professors. An associate professor is in Danish called a lektor and an assistant professor is called an adjunkt.

As an alternative to full professorship, it used to be possible to get a time limited (usually 5 years) position as professor MSO (professor med særlige opgaver), English: "professor with special responsibilities." The post of professor with special responsibilities involves fixed-term specific functions as well as duties that are otherwise associated with professorships. The qualification requirements correspond to those of ordinary professorships. This position gives time for the school to raise funds for the permanent professorship, and it was made as the rules do not as such allow promotions from associate to full professor. The professor MSO position was abolished in 2019 as part of an attempt to limit temporary positions.

Assistant professorships are temporary, but often the institution will open an associate professorship toward the end of the temporary position or the assistant professorship will be part of a tenure-track path to permanent employment. The use of the term tenure in Denmark has been criticized in the grounds that permanent positions are less secure compared to tenure in other countries, since the flexibility of the Danish job markets still makes it easy to fire people in tenured positions.

The term docent was used as an additional step between lektor and full professor before 1972, and around 1990 as mark of associate professors with special qualifications.

The Danish PhD does not come with the title dr. or doktor, only ph.d.; only the (higher) doctorate, after a similar extended thesis to the German docent, brings the right to be addressed as doktor.
