= Doctor of Professional Studies =

Doctoral degree for experienced professionals

The Doctor of Professional Studies (or sometimes awarded as Doctorate in Professional Practice) (most commonly DProf, DProfPrac or ProfD, but also available as DProfSt, ProfD and DPS) is a doctoral degree for experienced professionals who wish to undertake a program that is applied in nature and of practical value to their career. The DProf is based on applied research of real world problems. The DProf has been available to graduate students in the United Kingdom since the 1980s. The first Doctor of Professional Studies program was started in 1972 at Pace University. As another form of research doctorate and a doctoral level academic qualification, the DProf is equivalent to the PhD in terms of academic level and rigour, with the difference between the two lying in the type of research conducted and consequently in the type of knowledge generated (academic vs. practice-based).

== Development ==
The first professional doctoral program was established in 1972 by Pace University in the State of New York in the United States. Other universities around the world now offer the professional doctoral degree. Doctoral studies researchers, Gill and Hoppe, have reported rapid growth in professional doctoral degree programs outside of the United States.

In the United Kingdom, professional doctoral degrees became established in the 1980s, when it was recognized that high-level programs were needed that were designed for experienced professional practitioners rather than for academic researchers. Many professional doctoral degrees in the United Kingdom are profession-specific and contain a mix of taught modules, research and a dissertation. Several universities that offer professional doctoral degree programs in the United Kingdom allow students to study part-time. In 2005, Powell and Long found that most professional doctoral degrees awarded in the UK were in the fields of engineering, educational and clinical psychology. They found that professional doctoral degrees in business and nursing were also emerging at that time. In 2010, Brown and Cooke reported an "explosion" of professional doctorate programs in fields such as the arts, architecture and computer science. In 2016, the Higher Education Funding Council for England (HEFCE) released a comprehensive study of professional doctorates which found substantial growth in these programs. Since 2012, the UK Council for Graduate Education (UKCGE) has sponsored a bi-annual conference devoted to the study of professional doctoral education and related programs.

In the United States, the DPS was once considered by the United States Department of Education and the National Science Foundation (NSF) to be a research doctorate equivalent to the Ph.D. Along with the Doctor of Education, the Doctor of Social Science, the Doctor of Applied Science, and the Doctor of Library Science, the NSF no longer includes the DPS in its periodic Survey of Earned Doctorates (SEP) report, a statistical report on the number and range of research doctorates awarded in the United States. The DPS was dropped from the report in 2005. In New York State, the Doctor of Professional Studies is an official degree title applicable to doctoral programs with a professional focus in a variety of disciplines.

In a 2002 report, the Australian Department of Education, Science and Training (DEST), states "Doctoral education in Australia is currently under pressure to become more industry focused." Citing this report, Fink suggests "professional doctorates may be able to fulfill (the need to make doctoral education more industry focused) by developing and sustaining close collaboration between universities and industry. The Professional Doctorate (ProfDoc) can be seen as an alternative to the PhD because it can provide an opportunity for the business professional to gain a doctoral qualification, albeit in a different mode."

== Characteristics ==
In some respects the DProf is closer to the PhD than the longer-established modular doctorates, although it has important differences. While PhD theses typically make an original contribution to knowledge, the DProf is equally concerned with making a significant contribution to practice, as well as generating new, practice-based knowledge: it requires high-level practical action, resulting for instance in significant change or development in an organization or community of practice. Still, the dissertation must make a substantial contribution to the relevant literature with new, practice-based knowledge and be reflective of advanced thinking. In this regard, the effort required to complete a Doctor of Professional Studies degree is comparable to that required for a PhD.

Specific degree characteristics vary by country and institution. In 2011, the UK's Quality Assurance Agency for Higher Education published an overview of degree characteristics for all doctoral level degrees.

== See also ==
- Doctor of Arts
- Doctor of Business Administration
- Doctor of Education
- Doctor of Liberal Arts
- Doctor of Liberal Studies
- Doctor of Music
- Doctor of Philosophy
- Doctor of Psychology
- Doctor of Science
