= Dr. rer. nat. =

Academic degree corresponding to a Ph.D. in natural sciences

Doctor rerum naturalium (Latin for 'Doctor of Natural Sciences', lit. 'Doctor of the Things of Nature'), abbreviated Dr. rer. nat., is a doctoral degree in science awarded by universities in several European countries (e.g., Germany, Austria, and the Czech Republic) to graduates in fields such as physics, chemistry, biology, geosciences, computer science, pharmacy, psychology, and other natural sciences. Universities might also award different titles for these fields, depending on the topic of a doctoral thesis and which titles a university can award. In German-speaking Switzerland the equivalent of Dr. rer. nat. is Dr. phil. nat. The Karlsruhe Institute of Technology for example might award a Dr. rer. nat. or a Dr.-Ing. for computer science graduates, differentiating between degrees in theoretical and practical topics. These doctoral degrees are equivalent to the PhD awarded in English-speaking countries. German universities often translate a Dr. rer. nat. to doctorate of natural sciences or Doctor of Science.

To start a PhD in Germany, students must typically possess a master's degree in the related field. PhD programs in the natural sciences are often designed to allow graduation in three to five years, with an average graduation time of 4.3 years. The exact requirements for graduation differ by university but usually include the requirement of a substantial contribution to the field of study.

In the Czech Republic and Slovakia, a similarly designated degree, abbreviated RNDr., is awarded. It should not be confused with Dr. rer. nat., as the former is nowadays an extension of a master-like degree, but it used to be equivalent to PhD.

== See also ==
- Doctor of science
- Doctorate § Germany
- Academic degree § Czech Republic
- Doctor of Philosophy
