= Doctor of Music =

Academic degree

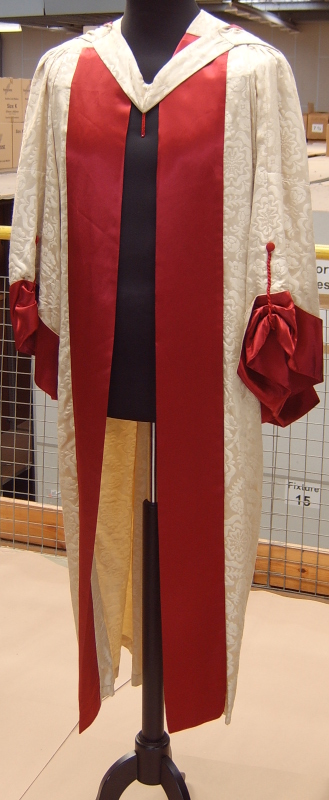
The full-dress robes of a Doctor of Music at Cambridge.

The Doctor of Music degree (DMus, DM, MusD or occasionally MusDoc) is a doctorate awarded on the basis of a substantial portfolio of compositions, musical performances, and/or scholarly publications on music.

In some institutions, the award is a higher doctorate, granted by universities in the United Kingdom, Ireland and some Commonwealth countries. Such universities often restrict candidature to their own graduates or staff. However, elsewhere (especially in UK conservatoires), the award is a standard PhD-level research doctoral degree in fields such as performance (including conducting) and musical composition, equivalent to the US Doctor of Musical Arts (DMA).

The DMus is usually distinct from the Doctor of Philosophy (PhD) degree in music, which is awarded in areas such as music history, music theory, and musicology. Nevertheless, many UK institutions (including universities and conservatoires) offer PhD awards that consist of portfolios of compositions, with or without an accompanying written thesis, thereby equivalent to DMus awards elsewhere.

The Doctor of Music degree has also been awarded honoris causa when presented to musicians and composers such as: Joseph Haydn, Richard Strauss, Pyotr Ilyich Tchaikovsky, Franz Liszt, Johannes Brahms, Felix Mendelssohn, and Sir Simon Rattle in classical music; and Joan Baez, Matt Bellamy, David Bowie, Phil Collins, Bruce Dickinson, Celine Dion, Irene Dunne, Bob Dylan, Kenny Garrett, Sir Barry Gibb, Robin Gibb, David Gilmour, Barbara Hendricks, Milt Hinton, Billy Joel, Nik Kershaw, Sir Elton John, B.B. King, Mark Knopfler, Annie Lennox, Jon Lord, Sir Paul McCartney, Joni Mitchell, Sir Van Morrison, Jimmy Page, Paul Simon, Joe Walsh, Brian Wilson, Stevie Wonder, Neil Young, and Taylor Swift in popular music. It has also been awarded as an honorary degree to musical artists who were not composers, including the ballet dancers Dame Alicia Markova and Dame Beryl Grey, as well as female royalty regardless of their experience in music.

== See also ==
- Doctor of Musical Arts (DMA)
