= Doctorate =

Academic or professional degree

A doctorate (from Latin doctor, meaning "teacher") or doctoral degree is a postgraduate academic degree awarded by universities and some other educational institutions, derived from the ancient formalism licentia docendi ("licence to teach").

In most countries, a research degree qualifies the holder to teach at university level in the degree's field or work in a specific profession. There are a number of doctoral degrees; the most common is the Doctor of Philosophy (PhD), awarded in many different fields, ranging from the humanities to the natural sciences.

Many universities also award honorary doctorates to individuals deemed worthy of special recognition, either for scholarly work or other contributions to the university or society.

== History ==
=== Middle Ages ===
The term doctor derives from Latin, meaning "teacher" or "instructor". The doctorate (Latin: doctoratus) appeared in medieval Europe as a license to teach Latin (licentia docendi) at a university. Its roots can be traced to the early church in which the term doctor referred to the Apostles, Church Fathers, and other Christian authorities who taught and interpreted the Bible.

The right to grant a licentia docendi (i.e. the doctorate) was originally reserved to the Catholic Church, which required the applicant to pass a test, take an oath of allegiance, and pay a fee. The Third Council of the Lateran of 1179 guaranteed access—at that time essentially free of charge—to all able applicants. Applicants were tested for aptitude. This right remained a bone of contention between the church authorities and the universities, slowly distancing themselves from the Church. In 1213 the right was granted by the pope to the University of Paris, where it became a universal license to teach (licentia ubique docendi). However, while the licentia continued to hold a higher prestige than the bachelor's degree (baccalaureus), the latter was ultimately reduced to an intermediate step to the master's degree (magister) and doctorate, both of which now became the accepted teaching qualifications. According to Keith Allan Noble (1994), the first doctoral degree was awarded in medieval Paris around 1150 by the University of Paris.

George Makdisi theorizes that the ijazah issued in early Islamic madrasahs was the origin of the doctorate later issued in medieval European universities. Alfred Guillaume and Syed Farid al-Attas agree that there is a resemblance between the ijazah and the licentia docendi. However, Toby Huff and others reject Makdisi's theory. Devin J. Stewart notes a difference in the granting authority (individual professor for the ijazah and a corporate entity in the case of the university doctorate).

=== 17th and 18th centuries ===
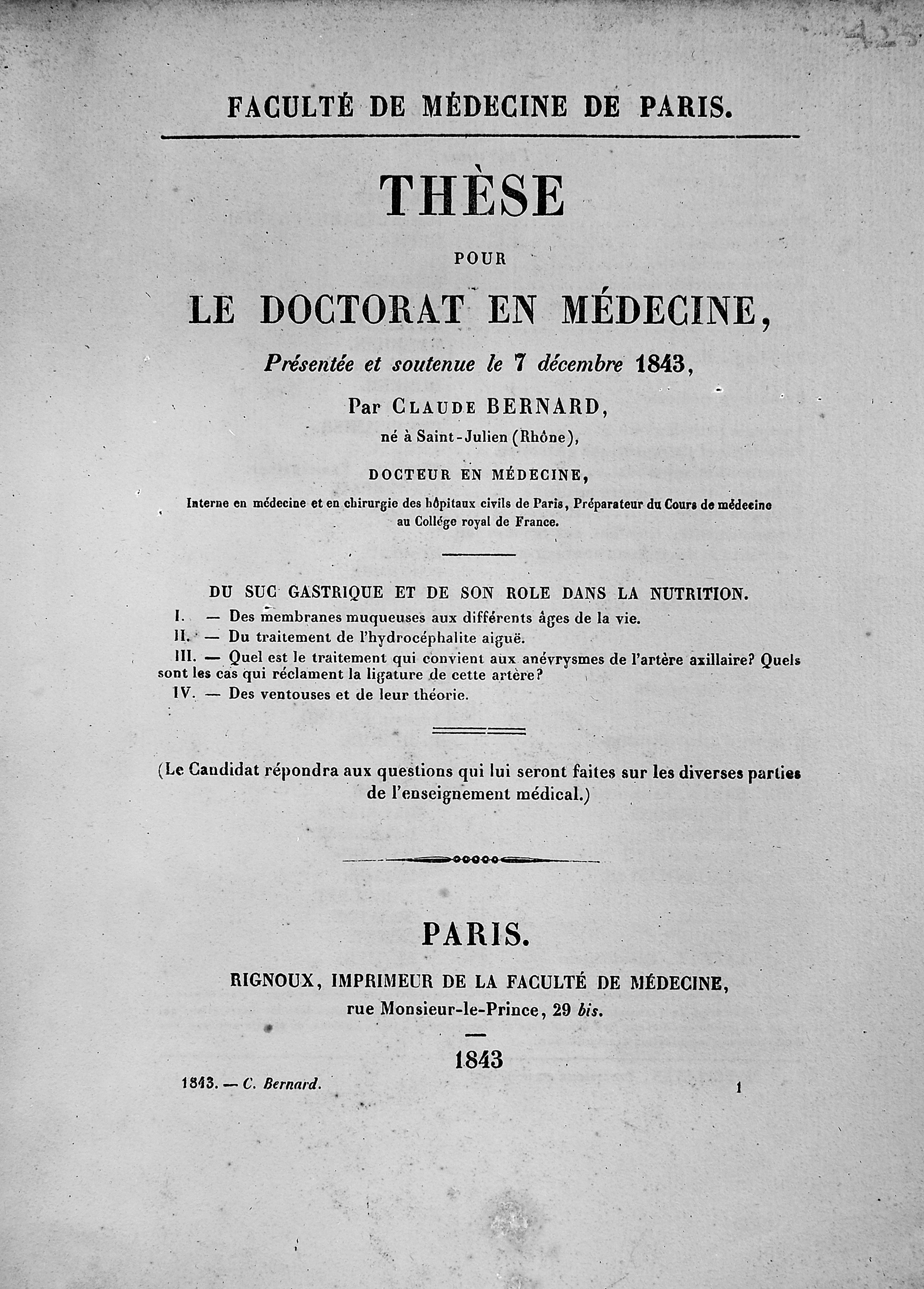
Title page of the thesis presented by Claude Bernard to obtain his Doctor of Medicine degree (1843)

The doctorate of philosophy developed in Germany in the 17th century (likely c. 1652). The term "philosophy" does not refer here to the field or academic discipline of philosophy; it is used in a broader sense under its original Greek meaning of "love of wisdom". In most of Europe, all fields (history, philosophy, social sciences, mathematics, and natural philosophy/natural sciences) were traditionally known as philosophy, and in Germany and elsewhere in Europe the basic faculty of liberal arts was known as the "faculty of philosophy". The Doctorate of Philosophy adheres to this historic convention, even though most degrees are not for the study of philosophy itself. Chris Park explains that it was not until formal education and degree programs were standardized in the early 19th century that the Doctorate of Philosophy was reintroduced in Germany (in what would become the Humboldt University of Berlin) as a research degree, abbreviated as Dr. phil. (similar to Ph.D. in Anglo-American countries). Germany, however, differentiated then in more detail between doctorates in philosophy and doctorates in the natural sciences, abbreviated as Dr. rer. nat. and also doctorates in the social/political sciences, abbreviated as Dr. rer. pol., similar to the other traditional doctorates in medicine (Dr. med.) and law (Dr. jur.).

University doctoral training was a form of apprenticeship to a guild. The traditional term of study before new teachers were admitted to the guild of "Masters of Arts" was seven years, matching the apprenticeship term for other occupations. Originally the terms "master" and "doctor" were synonymous, but over time, the doctorate came to be regarded as a higher qualification than the master's degree.

University degrees, including doctorates, were originally restricted to men. The first women to be granted doctorates were Juliana Morell in 1608 at Lyons or maybe Avignon (she "defended theses" in 1606 or 1607, although claims that she received a doctorate in canon law in 1608 have been discredited), Elena Cornaro Piscopia in 1678 at the University of Padua, Laura Bassi in 1732 at Bologna University, Dorothea Erxleben in 1754 at Halle University and María Isidra de Guzmán y de la Cerda in 1785 at Complutense University, Madrid.

=== Modern times ===
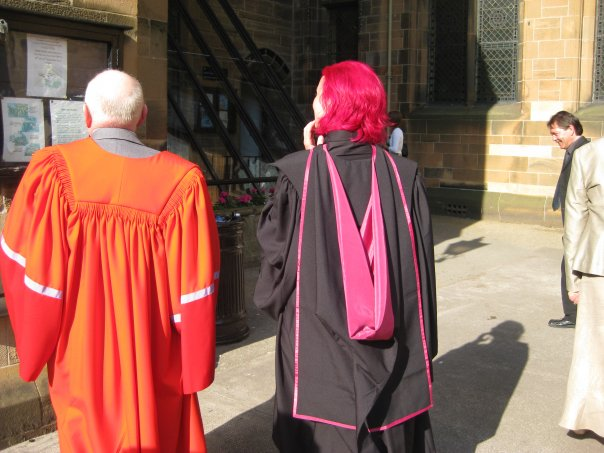
Man and woman wearing Durham and Glasgow PhD gowns, respectively

The use and meaning of the doctorate have changed over time and are subject to regional variations. For instance, until the early 20th century, few academic staff or professors in English-speaking universities held doctorates, except for very senior scholars and those in holy orders. After that time, the German practice of requiring lecturers to have completed a research doctorate spread. Universities' shift to research-oriented education (based upon the scientific method, inquiry, and observation) increased the doctorate's importance. Today, a research doctorate (PhD) or its equivalent (as defined in the US by the NSF) is generally a prerequisite for an academic career. However, many recipients do not work in academia.

Professional doctorates developed in the United States from the 19th century onward. The first professional doctorate offered in the United States was the MD at Kings College (now Columbia University) after the medical school's founding in 1767. However, this was a professional doctorate in the modern American sense. It was awarded for further study after the qualifying Bachelor of Medicine (MB) rather than a qualifying degree. The MD became the standard first degree in medicine in the US during the 19th century, but as a three-year undergraduate degree. It did not become established as a graduate degree until 1930. As the standard qualifying degree in medicine, the MD gave that profession the ability (through the American Medical Association, established in 1847 for this purpose) to set and raise standards for entry into professional practice.

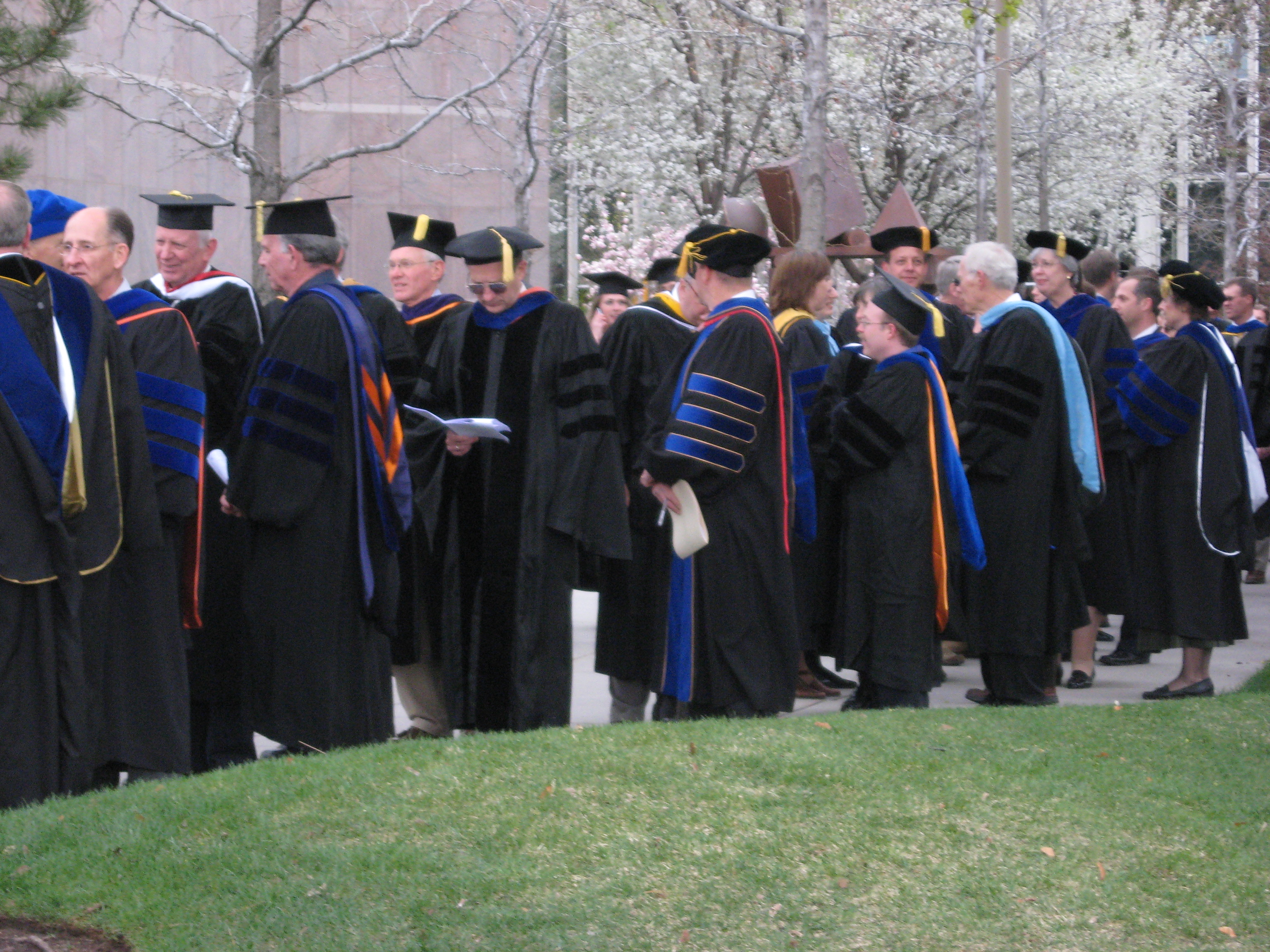
American academic doctors gather before the commencement exercises at Brigham Young University (April 2008). The American code for academic dress identifies academic doctors with three bands of velvet on the sleeve of the doctoral gown.

In the shape of the German-style PhD, the modern research degree was first awarded in the US in 1861, at Yale University. This differed from the MD in that the latter was a vocational "professional degree" that trained students to apply or practice knowledge rather than generate it, similar to other students in vocational schools or institutes. In the UK, research doctorates initially took higher doctorates in Science and Letters, first introduced at Durham University in 1882. The PhD spread to the UK from the US via Canada and was instituted at all British universities from 1917. The first (titled a DPhil) was awarded at the University of Oxford.

Following the MD, the next professional doctorate in the US, the Juris Doctor (JD), was established by the University of Chicago in 1902. However, it took a long time to be accepted, not replacing the Bachelor of Laws (LLB) until the 1960s, by which time the LLB was generally taken as a graduate degree. Notably, the JD and LLB curriculum were identical, with the degree being renamed as a doctorate, and it (like the MD) was not equivalent to the PhD, raising criticism that it was "not a 'true Doctorate'". When professional doctorates were established in the UK in the late 1980s and early 1990s, they did not follow the US model. Still, they were set up as research degrees at the same level as PhDs but with some taught components and a professional focus for research work.

Now usually called higher doctorates in the United Kingdom, the older-style doctorates take much longer to complete since candidates must show themselves to be leading experts in their subjects. These doctorates are less common than the PhD in some countries and are often awarded honoris causa. A degree beyond a doctorate, the habilitation is used for academic recruitment purposes in several countries within the EU. Especially in Germany, it can be a requirement for appointment as a Privatdozent or professor. The habilitation requires the candidate to either produce a second, generally longer thesis or a portfolio of research publications. The habilitation aims to demonstrate independent and thorough research, experience in teaching and lecturing, and, more recently, the ability to generate supportive funding.

== Types ==
Since the Middle Ages, the number and types of doctorates awarded by universities have proliferated throughout the world. Practice varies from one country to another. While a doctorate usually entitles a person to be addressed as "doctor", the use of the title varies widely depending on the type and the associated occupation.

=== Research doctorate ===
Research doctorates are awarded in recognition of publishable academic research, at least in principle, in a peer-reviewed academic journal. The best-known research degree in the English-speaking world is the Doctor of Philosophy (abbreviated PhD or, at a small number of British universities, DPhil) awarded in many countries throughout the world. In the US, for instance, although the most typical research doctorate is the PhD, accounting for about 98% of the research doctorates awarded, there are more than 15 other types of research doctorates. Other research-oriented doctorates (some having a professional practice focus) include the Doctor of Education (EdD), the Doctor of Science (DSc or ScD), Doctor of Arts (DA), Doctor of Juridical Science (JSD or SJD), Doctor of Musical Arts (DMA), Doctor of Professional Studies/Professional Doctorate (ProfDoc or DProf), Doctor of Public Health (DrPH), Doctor of Social Science (DSSc or DSocSci), Doctor of Management (DM, DMan or DMgt), Doctor of Business Administration (DBA), Doctor of Engineering (DEng, DESc, DES or EngD) the German engineering doctorate Doktoringenieur (Dr.-Ing.), natural science doctorate Doctor rerum naturalium (Dr. rer. nat.), and economics and social science doctorate Doctor rerum politicarum (Dr. rer. pol.). The UK Doctor of Medicine (MD or MD (Res)) and Doctor of Dental Surgery (DDS) are research doctorates. The Doctor of Theology (ThD or DTh), Doctor of Practical Theology (DPT) and the Doctor of Sacred Theology (STD, or DSTh) are research doctorates in theology.

Criteria for research doctorates vary but typically require completion of a substantial body of original research, which may be presented as a single thesis or dissertation, or as a portfolio of shorter project reports (thesis by publication). Certain doctoral programs employ alternative assessment models, in which the degree is awarded based on coursework, examinations, or peer-reviewed publications rather than a single monographic dissertation. The submitted dissertation is assessed by a committee of, typically, internal, and external examiners. It is then typically defended by the candidate during an oral examination (called viva (voce) in the UK and India) by the committee, which then awards the degree unconditionally, awards the degree conditionally (ranging from corrections in grammar to additional research), or denies the degree. Candidates may also be required to complete graduate-level courses in their field and study research methodology.

Criteria for admission to doctoral programs vary. Students may be admitted with a bachelor's degree in the US and the UK. However, elsewhere, (e.g., in Finland and many other European countries), a master's degree is required. The time required to complete a research doctorate varies from three years, excluding undergraduate study, to six years or more.

=== Licentiate ===
Licentiate degrees vary widely in their meaning, and in a few countries are doctoral-level qualifications. Sweden awards the licentiate degree as a two-year qualification at the doctoral level and the doctoral degree (PhD) as a four-year qualification. Sweden originally abolished the Licentiate in 1969 but reintroduced it in response to demands from business. Finland also has a two-year doctoral level licentiate degree, similar to Sweden's. Outside of Scandinavia, the licentiate is usually a lower-level qualification. In Belgium, the licentiate was the basic university degree prior to the Bologna Process and was equivalent to a bachelor's degree. In France and other countries, it is the bachelor's-level qualification in the Bologna process. In the Pontifical system, the Licentiate in Sacred Theology (STL) is equivalent to an advanced master's degree, or the post-master's coursework required in preparation for a doctorate (i.e. similar in level to the Swedish/Finnish licentiate degree). While other licences (such as the Licence in Canon Law) are at the level of master's degrees.

=== Higher doctorates and post-doctoral degrees ===
A higher tier of research doctorates may be awarded based on a formally submitted portfolio of published research of an exceptionally high standard. In the UK, Ireland and some Commonwealth countries, higher doctorates that are awarded are: Doctor of Divinity (DD), Doctor of Engineering (DEng), Doctor of Civil Law (DCL), Doctor of Law or Laws (LLD), Doctor of Letters (DLitt or LittD), Doctor of Medicine (MD), Doctor of Music (DMus), Doctor of Science (DSc or ScD), Doctor of Social Science (DSocSc or DSSc), and Doctor of Technology (DTech). Countries in the region of Scandinavia offer a higher research doctorate like the Doctor Medicinae (Dr. Med.).

The habilitation teaching qualification (facultas docendi or "faculty to teach") under a university procedure with a thesis and an exam is commonly regarded as belonging to this category in Germany, Austria, France, Liechtenstein, Switzerland, Poland, etc. The degree developed in Germany in the 19th century "when holding a doctorate seemed no longer sufficient to guarantee a proficient transfer of knowledge to the next generation". In many federal states of Germany, the habilitation results in an award of a formal Dr. habil. degree or the holder of the degree may add habil. to their research doctorate such as Dr. phil. habil. or Dr. rer. nat. habil. In some European universities, especially in German-speaking countries, the degree is insufficient to have teaching duties without professor supervision (or to teach and supervise PhD students independently) without an additional teaching title such as Privatdozent. In Austria, the habilitation bestows the graduate with the facultas docendi, venia legendi. In many Central and Eastern Europe countries, the degree gives the venia legendi, Latin for "the permission to lecture", or ius docendi, "the right to teach", a specific academic subject at universities for a lifetime. The French academic system used to have a higher doctorate, called the "state doctorate" (doctorat d'État), but, in 1984, it was superseded by the habilitation (Habilitation à diriger des recherches, "habilitation to supervise (doctoral and post-doctoral) research", abbreviated HDR) which is the prerequisite to supervise PhDs and to apply to full professorships.

In many countries of the former Soviet Union (USSR), for example the Russian Federation or Ukraine, there is a degree called the Doctor of Sciences, which is somewhat similar to habilitation in requiring a dissertation, but it is focused on research performance and does not have heavy teaching requirements.

Higher doctorates may also be awarded as honorary degrees – either on an institution's own initiative or following a nomination – in recognition of public prestige, institutional service, philanthropy or professional achievement. In a formal listing of qualifications, and often in other contexts, an honorary higher doctorate may be identified in various ways, including "DCL, honoris causa", "Hon LLD" or "LittD h.c.".

Some Latin American countries award a postdoctoral degree, or posdoctorado involving structured postdoctoral studies and research. Depending on the country, this may be called a diploma de posdoctorado (postdoctoral diploma), título de Posdoctorado (postdoctoral degree) or simply posdoctorado (postdoctorate).

=== Professional doctorate ===
Depending on the country, professional doctorates may also be research degrees at the same level as PhDs. The relationship between research and practice is considered important and professional degrees with little or no research content are typically aimed at professional performance. Many professional doctorates are named "Doctor of [subject name] and abbreviated using the form "D[subject abbreviation]" or "[subject abbreviation]D", or may use the more generic titles "Professional Doctorate", abbreviated "ProfDoc" or "DProf", "Doctor of Professional Studies" (DPS) or "Doctor of Professional Practice" (DPP).

In the US, professional doctorates (formally "doctor's degree – professional practice" in government classifications) are defined by the US Department of Education's National Center for Educational Statistics as degrees that require a minimum of six years of university-level study (including any pre-professional bachelor's or associate degree) and meet the academic requirements for professional licensure in the discipline. The definition for a professional doctorate does not include a requirement for either a dissertation or study beyond master's level, in contrast to the definition for research doctorates ("doctor's degree – research/scholarship"). However, individual programs may have different requirements. There is also a category of "doctor's degree – other" for doctorates that do not fall into either the "professional practice" or "research/scholarship" categories. All of these are considered doctoral degrees.

In contrast to the US, many countries reserve the term "doctorate" for research degrees. If, as in Canada and Australia, professional degrees bear the name "Doctor of ...", etc., it is made clear that these are not doctorates. Examples of this include Doctor of Medicine (MD), Doctor of Dental Surgery (DDS) and Juris Doctor (JD). Contrariwise, for example, research doctorates like Doctor of Business Administration (DBA), Doctor of Education (EdD) and Doctor of Social Science (DSS) qualify as full academic doctorates in Canada though they normally incorporate aspects of professional practice in addition to a full dissertation. In the Philippines, the University of the Philippines Open University offers a Doctor of Communication (DComm) professional doctorate.

All doctorates in the UK and Ireland are third cycle qualifications in the Bologna Process, comparable to US research doctorates. Although all doctorates are research degrees, professional doctorates normally include taught components, while the name PhD/DPhil is normally used for doctorates purely by thesis. Professional, practitioner, or practice-based doctorates such as the DClinPsy, DPsych, MD, DHSc, EdD, DBA, EngD and DAg are full academic doctorates. They are at the same level as the PhD in the national qualifications frameworks; they are not first professional degrees but are "often post-experience qualifications" in which practice is considered important in the research context. In 2009 there were 308 professional doctorate programs in the UK, up from 109 in 1998, with the most popular being the EdD (38 institutions), DBA (33), EngD/DEng (22), MD/DM (21), and DClinPsy/DClinPsych/ClinPsyD (17). Similarly, in Australia, the term "professional doctorate" is sometimes applied to the Scientiae Juridicae Doctor (SJD), which, like the UK professional doctorates, is a research degree.

=== Honorary doctorate ===
When a university wishes to formally recognize an individual's contributions to a particular field or philanthropic efforts, it may choose to grant a doctoral degree honoris causa ('for the sake of the honor'), waiving the usual requirements for granting the degree. Some universities do not award honorary degrees; for example, Cornell University, the University of Virginia, and Massachusetts Institute of Technology.

== National variations ==
=== Argentina ===
In Argentina the doctorate (doctorado) is the highest academic degree. The intention is that candidates produce original contributions in their field knowledge within a frame of academic excellence. A dissertation or thesis is prepared under the supervision of a tutor or director. It is reviewed by a Doctoral Committee composed of examiners external to the program and at least one examiner external to the institution. The degree is conferred after a successful dissertation defence. In 2006, there were approximately 2,151 postgraduate careers in the country, of which 14% were doctoral degrees. Doctoral programs in Argentina are overseen by the National Commission for University Evaluation and Accreditation, an agency in Argentina's Ministry of Education, Science and Technology.

=== Australia ===
The Australian Qualifications Framework (AQF) categorizes tertiary qualifications into ten levels that are numbered from one to ten in ascending order of complexity and depth. Of these qualification levels, six are for higher education qualifications and are numbered from five to ten. Doctoral degrees occupy the highest of these levels: level ten. All doctoral degrees involve research and this is a defining characteristic of them. There are three categories of doctoral degrees recognized by the AQF: research doctorates, professional doctorates and higher doctorates.

Research doctorates and professional doctorates are both completed as part of a programme of study and supervised research. Both have entry requirements of the student having a supervisor that has agreed to supervise their research, along with the student possessing an honours degree with upper second-class honours or better or a master's degree with a substantial research component. Research doctorates are typically titled Doctor of Philosophy and they are awarded on the basis of an original and significant contribution to knowledge. Professional doctorates are typically titled Doctor of (field of study) and they are awarded on the basis of an original and significant contribution to professional practice.

Higher doctorates are typically titled similarly to professional doctorates and are awarded based on a submitted portfolio of research that follows a consistent theme and is internationally recognized as an original and substantive contribution to knowledge beyond that required for the awarding of a research doctorate. Typically, to be eligible to be awarded a higher doctorate a student must have completed a research doctorate at least seven to ten years prior to submitting the research portfolio used to award them a higher doctorate.

=== Brazil ===
Doctoral candidates are normally required to have a master's degree in a related field. Exceptions are based on their individual academic merit. A second and a third foreign language are other common requirements, although the requirements regarding proficiency commonly are not strict. The admissions process varies by institution. Some require candidates to take tests while others base admissions on a research proposal application and interview only. In both instances however, a faculty member must agree prior to admission to supervise the applicant.

Requirements usually include satisfactory performance in advanced graduate courses, passing an oral qualifying exam and submitting a thesis that must represent an original and relevant contribution to existing knowledge. The thesis is examined in a final public oral exam administered by at least five faculty members, two of whom must be external. After completion, which normally consumes 4 years, the candidate is commonly awarded the degree of Doutor (Doctor) followed by the main area of specialization, e.g. Doutor em Direito (Doctor of Laws), Doutor em Ciências da Computação (Doctor of Computer Sciences), Doutor em Filosofia (Doctor of Philosophy), Doutor em Economia (Doctor of Economics), Doutor em Engenharia (Doctor of Engineering) or Doutor em Medicina (Doctor of Medicine). The generic title of Doutor em Ciências (Doctor of Sciences) is normally used to refer collectively to doctorates in the natural sciences (i.e. Physics, Chemistry, Biological and Life Sciences, etc.)

All graduate programs in Brazilian public universities are tuition-free (mandated by the Brazilian constitution). Some graduate students are additionally supported by institutional scholarships granted by federal government agencies like CNPq (Conselho Nacional de Desenvolvimento Científico e Tecnológico) and CAPES (Coordenação de Aperfeiçoamento do Pessoal de Ensino Superior). Personal scholarships are provided by the various FAP's (Fundações de Amparo à Pesquisa) at the state level, especially FAPESP in the state of São Paulo, FAPERJ in the state of Rio de Janeiro and FAPEMIG in the state of Minas Gerais. Competition for graduate financial aid is intense and most scholarships support at most 2 years of master's studies and 4 years of doctoral studies. The normal monthly stipend for doctoral students in Brazil is between US$500 and $1000.

A degree of Doutor usually enables an individual to apply for a junior faculty position equivalent to a US assistant professor. Progression to full professorship, known as Professor Titular, requires that the candidate be successful in a competitive public exam and normally takes additional years. In the federal university system, doctors who are admitted as junior faculty members may progress (usually by seniority) to the rank of associate professor, then become eligible to take the competitive exam for vacant full professorships. In São Paulo state universities, associate professorships and subsequent eligibility to apply for a full professorship are conditioned on the qualification of Livre-docente and require, in addition to a doctorate, a second thesis or cumulative portfolio of peer-reviewed publications, a public lecture before a panel of experts (including external members from other universities), and a written exam.

In recent years some initiatives as jointly supervised doctorates (e.g. "cotutelles") have become increasingly common in the country, as part of the country's efforts to open its universities to international students.

=== Denmark ===
Denmark offers two types of "doctorate"-like degrees:

1. A three-year ph.d. degree program, which replaced the equivalent licentiat in 1992, and does not grant the holder the right to the title dr. or doktor. At the same time, a minor, two-year research training program, leading to a title of "magister", was phased out to meet the international standards of the Bologna Process.
2. A 'full' doctor's degree (e.g. dr.phil., Doctor Philosophiae, for humanistic and STEM subjects) – the higher doctorate – introduced in 1479. The second part of the title communicates the field of study – e.g. dr.scient (in the sciences), dr.jur (in law), dr.theol (in theology).

For the ph.d. degree, the candidates (ph.d. students or fellows) – who are required to have a master's degree – enroll at a ph.d. school at a university and participate in a research training program, at the end of which they each submit a thesis and defend it orally at a formal disputation. In the disputation, the candidates defend their theses against three official opponents, and may take opponents or questions from those present in the auditorium (ex auditorio).

For the higher doctorate, the candidate (referred to as præses) is required to submit a thesis of major scientific significance, and to proceed to defend it orally against two official opponents, as well as against any and all opponents from the auditorium (ex auditorio) – no matter how long the proceedings take. The official opponents are required to be full professors. The candidate is required to have a master's degree, but not necessarily a ph.d.

The ph.d. was introduced as a separate title from the higher doctorate in 1992 as part of the transition to a new degree structure, since the changes in the degree system would otherwise leave a significant amount of academics without immediately recognizable qualifications in international settings. The original vision was purported to be to phase out the higher doctorate in favor of the ph.d. (or merge the two), but so far, there are no signs of this happening. Many Danish academics with permanent positions wrote ph.d. dissertations in the 90s when the system was new, since at that time, a ph.d. degree or equivalent qualifications began to be required for certain academic positions in Denmark. Until the late 20th century, the higher doctorate was a condition for attaining full professorship; it is no longer required per se for any positions, but is considered amply equivalent to the ph.d. when applying for academic positions.

=== Egypt ===
In Egypt, the highest degree of doctorate is awarded by Al-Azhar University, which grants habilitation (Arabic: العالمية, romanized: ālimiyya).

The medical doctorate (abbreviated as M.D.) is equivalent to the Ph.D. degree. To earn an M.D. in a science specialty, one must have a master's degree (M.Sc.) (or two diplomas before the introduction of the M.Sc. degree in Egypt) before applying. The M.D. degree involves courses in the field and defending a dissertation. It takes on average three to five years.

Many postgraduate medical and surgical specialties students earn a doctorate. After finishing a 6-year medical school and one-year internship (house officer), physicians and surgeons earn the M.B. B.Ch. degree, which is equivalent to a US MD degree. They can then apply to earn a master's degree or a speciality diploma, then an MD degree in a specialty.

The Egyptian M.D. degree is written using the name of one's specialty. For example, M.D. (Geriatrics) means a doctorate in Geriatrics, which is equivalent to a Ph.D. in Geriatrics.

=== Finland ===
The Finnish requirement for the entrance into doctoral studies is a master's degree or equivalent. All universities have the right to award doctorates. The ammattikorkeakoulu institutes (institutes of higher vocational education that are not universities but often called "Universities of Applied Sciences" in English) do not award doctoral or other academic degrees. The student must:

- Demonstrate understanding of their field and its meaning, while preparing to use scientific or scholarly study in their field, creating new knowledge.
- Obtain a good understanding of development, basic problems and research methods
- Obtain such understanding of the general theory of science and letters and such knowledge of neighbouring research fields that they are able to follow the development of these fields.

The way to show that these general requirements have been met is to:

- Complete graduate coursework.
- Demonstrate critical and independent thought
- Prepare and publicly defend a dissertation (a monograph or a compilation thesis of peer-reviewed articles). In fine arts, the dissertation may be substituted by works and/or performances as accepted by the faculty.

Entrance to a doctoral program is available only for holders of a master's degree; there is no honors procedure for recruiting those with only a bachelor's degree. Entrance is not as controlled as in undergraduate studies, where a strict numerus clausus is applied. Usually, a prospective student discusses their plans with a professor. If the professor agrees to accept the student, the student applies for admission. The professor may recruit students to their group. Formal acceptance does not imply funding. The student must obtain funding either by working in a research unit or through private scholarships. Funding is more available for natural and engineering sciences than in letters. Sometimes, normal work and research activity are combined.

Prior to introduction of the Bologna process, Finland required at least 42 credit weeks (1,800 hours) of formal coursework. The requirement was removed in 2005, leaving the decision to individual universities, which may delegate the authority to faculties or individual professors. In Engineering and Science, required coursework varies between 40 and 70 ECTS.

The duration of graduate studies varies. It is possible to graduate three years after the master's degree, while much longer periods are not uncommon. The study ends with a dissertation, which must present substantial new scientific/scholarly knowledge. The dissertation can either be a monograph or it an edited collection of 3 to 7 journal articles. Students unable or unwilling to write a dissertation may qualify for a licentiate degree by completing the coursework requirement and writing a shorter thesis, usually summarizing one year of research.

When the dissertation is ready, the faculty names two expert pre-examiners with doctoral degrees from the outside the university. During the pre-examination process, the student may receive comments on the work and respond with modifications. After the pre-examiners approve, the doctoral candidate applies the faculty for permission to print the thesis. When granting this permission, the faculty names the opponent for the thesis defence, who must also be an outside expert, with at least a doctorate. In all Finnish universities, long tradition requires that the printed dissertation hang on a cord by a public university noticeboard for at least ten days prior to for the dissertation defence.

The doctoral dissertation takes place in public. The opponent and the candidate conduct a formal debate, usually wearing white tie, under the supervision of the thesis supervisor. Family, friends, colleagues and the members of the research community customarily attend the defence. After a formal entrance, the candidate begins with an approximately 20-minute popular lecture (lectio praecursoria), that is meant to introduce laymen to the thesis topic. The opponent follows with a short talk on the topic, after which the pair critically discuss the dissertation. The proceedings take two to three hours. At the end the opponent presents their final statement and reveals whether he/she will recommend that the faculty accept it. Any member of the public then has an opportunity to raise questions, although this is rare. Immediately after the defence, the supervisor, the opponent and the candidate drink coffee with the public. Usually, the attendees of the defence are given the printed dissertation. In the evening, the passed candidate hosts a dinner (Finnish: karonkka) in honour of the opponent. Usually, the candidate invites their family, colleagues and collaborators.

Doctoral graduates are often Doctors of Philosophy (filosofian tohtori), but many fields retain their traditional titles: Doctor of Medicine (lääketieteen tohtori), Doctor of Science in technology (tekniikan tohtori), Doctor of Science in arts (Art and Design), etc.

The doctorate is a formal requirement for a docenture or professor's position, although these in practice require postdoctoral research and further experience. Exceptions may be granted by the university governing board, but this is uncommon, and usually due to other work and expertise considered equivalent.

=== France ===
==== History ====
Before 1984 three research doctorates existed in France: the State doctorate (doctorat d'État, "DrE", the old doctorate introduced in 1808), the third cycle doctorate (doctorat de troisième cycle, also called doctorate of specialty, doctorat de spécialité, created in 1954 and shorter than the State doctorate) and the diploma of doctor-engineer (diplôme de docteur-ingénieur created in 1923), for technical research.

During the first half of the 20th century, following the submission of two theses (primary thesis, thèse principale, and secondary thesis, thèse complémentaire) to the Faculty of Letters (in France, "letters" is equivalent to "humanities") at the University of Paris, the doctoral candidate was awarded the Doctorat ès lettres. There was also the less prestigious "university doctorate", doctorat d'université, which could be received for the submission of a single thesis.

In the 1950s, the Doctorat ès lettres was renamed to Doctorat d'État. In 1954 (for the sciences) and 1958 (for letters and human sciences), the less demanding doctorat de troisième cycle degree was created on the model of the American Ph.D. with the purpose to lessen what had become an increasingly long period of time between the typical students' completion of their Diplôme d'études supérieures, roughly equivalent to a Master of Arts, and their Doctorat d'État.

After 1984, only one type of doctoral degree remained: the "doctorate" (Doctorat). A special diploma was created called the "Habilitation to Supervise Research" (also translated as "accreditation to supervise research"; Habilitation à diriger des recherches), a professional qualification to supervise doctoral work. (This diploma is similar in spirit to the older State doctorate, and the requirements for obtaining it are similar to those necessary to obtain tenure in other systems.) Before only professors or senior full researchers of similar rank were normally authorized to supervise a doctoral candidate's work. Now habilitation is a prerequisite to the title of professor in university (Professeur des universités) and to the title of Research Director (Directeur de recherche) in national public research agency such as CNRS, INRIA, or INRAE.

==== Admission ====
Today, the doctorate (doctorat) is a research-only degree. It is a national degree and its requirements are fixed by the minister of higher education and research. Only public institutions award the doctorate. It can be awarded in any field of study. The master's degree is a prerequisite. The normal duration is three years. The writing of a comprehensive thesis constitutes the bulk of the doctoral work. While the length of the thesis varies according to the discipline, it is rarely less than 150 pages, and often substantially more. Some 15,000 new doctoral matriculations occur every year and ≈10,000 doctorates are awarded.

Doctoral candidates can apply for a three-year fellowship. The most well known is the Contrat Doctoral (4,000 granted every year with a gross salary of 2300 euros per month as of January 2026).

Since 2002, candidates follow in-service training, but there is no written examination for the doctorate. The candidate has to write a thesis that is read by two external reviewers. The head of the institution decides whether the candidate can defend the thesis, after considering the external reviews. The jury members are designated by the head of the institution. The candidate's supervisor and the external reviewers are generally jury members. The maximum number of jury members is 8. The defense generally lasts 45 minutes in scientific fields, followed by 1 – 2 1/2 hours of questions from the jury or other doctors present. The defense and questions are public. The jury then deliberates in private and then declares the candidate admitted or "postponed". The latter is rare. New regulations were set in 2016 and do not award distinctions.

The title of doctor (docteur) can also be used by medical and pharmaceutical practitioners who hold a doctor's State diploma (diplôme d'État de docteur, distinct from the doctorat d'État mentioned above). The diploma is a first-degree.

A guideline with good practices and legal analysis has been published in 2018 by the Association nationale des docteurs (ANDès) and the Confédération des Jeunes Chercheurs (CJC) with funding from the French Ministry of research.

=== Germany ===
Doctoral degrees in Germany are research doctorates and are awarded by a process called Promotion. Most doctorates are awarded with specific Latin designations for the field of research (except for engineering, where the designation is German), instead of a general name for all fields (such as the Ph.D.). The most important degrees are:

- Dr. theol. (theologiae; theology);
- Dr. phil. (philosophiae; humanities such as philosophy, philology, history, and social sciences such as sociology, political science, or psychology as well);
- Dr. rer. nat. (rerum naturalium; natural and formal sciences, i.e. physics, chemistry, biology, mathematics, computer science and information technology, or psychology);
- Dr. iur. (iuris; law);
- Dr. med. (medicinae; medicine);
- Dr. med. dent. (medicinae dentariae; dentistry);
- Dr. med. vet. (medicinae veterinariae; veterinary medicine);
- Dr.-Ing. (engineering);
- Dr. oec. (oeconomiae; economics);
- Dr. rer. pol. (rerum politicarum; economics, business administration, political science).

The concept of a US-style professional doctorate as an entry-level professional qualification does not exist. Professional doctorates obtained in other countries, not requiring a thesis or not being third cycle qualifications under the Bologna process, can only be used postnominally, e.g., "Max Mustermann, MD", and do not allow the use of the title Dr.

In medicine, "doctoral" dissertations are often written alongside undergraduate study. The European Research Council therefore decided in 2010 that such Dr. med. degrees do not meet the international standards of a Ph.D. research degree. The duration of the doctorate depends on the field: a doctorate in medicine may take less than a full-time year to complete; those in other fields, two to six years.

Over fifty doctoral designations exist, many of them rare or no longer in use. As a title, the degree is commonly written in front of the name in abbreviated form, e.g., Dr. rer. nat. Max Mustermann or Dr. Max Mustermann, dropping the designation entirely. However, leaving out the designation is only allowed when the doctorate degree is not an honorary doctorate, which must be indicated by Dr. h.c. (from Latin honoris causa). Although the honorific does not become part of the name, holders can demand that the title appear in official documents. The title is not mandatory. The honorific is commonly used in formal letters. For holders of other titles, only the highest title is mentioned. In contrast to English, in which a person's name is preceded by at most one title (except in very ceremonious usage), the formal German mode of address permits several titles in addition to "Herr" or "Frau" (which, unlike "Mr" or "Ms", is not considered a title at all, but an Anrede or "address"), including repetitions in the case of multiple degrees, as in "Frau Prof. Dr. Dr. Schmidt", for a person who would be addressed as "Prof. Schmidt" in English.

In the German university system it is common to write two doctoral theses, the inaugural thesis (Inauguraldissertation), completing a course of study, and the habilitation thesis (Habilitationsschrift), which opens the road to a professorship. Upon completion of the habilitation thesis, a Habilitation is awarded, which is indicated by appending habil. (habilitata/habilitatus) to the doctorate, e.g., Dr. rer. nat. habil. Max Mustermann. It is considered as an additional academic qualification rather than an academic degree formally. It qualifies the owner to teach at German universities (facultas docendi). The holder of a Habilitation receives the authorization to teach a certain subject (venia legendi). This has been the traditional prerequisite for attaining Privatdozent (PD) and employment as a full university professor. With the introduction of Juniorprofessuren—around 2005—as an alternative track towards becoming a professor at universities (with tenure), Habilitation is no longer the only university career track.

=== India ===
In India, doctorates are offered by universities. Entry requirements include a master's degree. Some universities consider undergraduate degrees in professional areas such as engineering, medicine or law as qualifications for pursuing doctorate level degrees. Entrance examinations are held for almost all programs. In most universities, the duration of coursework and writing the thesis is 3–7 years. The most common doctoral degree is a Ph.D.

=== Ireland ===
In Ireland, doctoral qualifications are classified at Level 10 of the National Framework of Qualifications (NFQ). The major award types at Level 10 are the doctoral degree and the higher doctorate. The Irish NFQ is aligned with the Framework for Qualifications of the European Higher Education Area, which supports the international recognition of Irish research degrees.

Ireland has a National Framework for Doctoral Education, which is intended to support excellence in all forms of doctoral education. The revised 2023 framework sets out principles for doctoral education, including an original contribution to knowledge, a high-quality research environment, supervision and examination arrangements, and a final research thesis comprising work of publishable quality.

Professional doctorates in Ireland are also doctoral-level qualifications. Quality and Qualifications Ireland states that validation of a professional doctorate requires research accreditation at NFQ Level 10 in the relevant discipline area. Professional doctorate programmes normally include a significant prescribed course of study, but the production of an individual thesis or coherent body of doctoral-level work remains a major part of the programme and is assessed using a process similar to that used for PhD theses, including a viva voce examination.

=== Italy ===
Until the introduction of the dottorato di ricerca in the mid-1980s, the laurea generally constituted the highest academic degree obtainable in Italy. The first institution in Italy to create a doctoral program was Scuola Normale Superiore di Pisa in 1927 under the historic name "Diploma di Perfezionamento". The dottorato di ricerca was introduced by law and presidential decree in 1980, in a reform of academic teaching, training and experimentation in organisation and teaching methods.

Italy uses a three-level degree system following the Bologna Process. The first-level degree, called a laurea (bachelor's degree), requires three years and a short thesis. The second-level degree, called a laurea magistrale (master's degree), is obtained after two additional years, specializing in a branch of the field. This degree requires more advanced thesis work, usually involving academic research or an internship. The final degree is called a dottorato di ricerca (Ph.D.) and is obtained after three years of academic research on the subject and a thesis.

Alternatively, after obtaining the laurea or the laurea magistrale, one can complete a "master's" (first-level master's after the laurea or second-level master's after the laurea magistrale) of one or two years, usually including an internship. An Italian "master's" is not the same as a master's degree; it is intended to be more focused on professional training and practical experience.

Regardless of the field of study, the title for Bachelors Graduate students is Dottore/Dottoressa (abbrev. Dott./Dott.ssa, or as Dr.), not to be confused with the title for the Ph.D., which is instead Dottore/Dottoressa di Ricerca. A laurea magistrale grants instead the title of Dottore/Dottoressa magistrale. Graduates in the fields of Education, Art and Music are also called Dr. Prof. (or simply Professore) or Maestro. Many professional titles, such as ingegnere (engineer) are awarded only upon passing a post-graduation examination (esame di stato), and registration in the relevant professional association.

The Superior Graduate Schools in Italy (Italian: Scuola Superiore Universitaria), also called Schools of Excellence (Italian: Scuole di Eccellenza) such as Scuola Normale Superiore di Pisa and Sant'Anna School of Advanced Studies keep their historical "Diploma di Perfezionamento" title by law and MIUR Decree.

=== Japan ===
==== Dissertation-only ====
Until the 1990s, most natural science and engineering doctorates in Japan were earned by industrial researchers in Japanese companies. These degrees were awarded by the employees' former university, usually after years of research in industrial laboratories. The only requirement is submission of a dissertation, along with articles published in well-known journals. This program is called ronbun hakushi (hakase) (論文博士). It produced the majority of engineering doctoral degrees from national universities. University-based doctoral programs called katei hakushi (hakase) (課程博士), are gradually replacing these degrees. By 1994, more doctoral engineering degrees were earned for research within university laboratories (53%) than industrial research laboratories (47%). Since 1978, Japan Society for the Promotion of Science (JSPS) has provided tutorial and financial support for promising researchers in Asia and Africa. The program is called JSPS RONPAKU.

==== Professional degree ====
The only professional doctorate in Japan is the Juris Doctor, known as hōmu hakushi (法務博士) The program generally lasts two or three years. This curriculum is professionally oriented, but unlike in the US the program does not provide education sufficient for a law license. All candidates for a bar license must pass the bar exam (shihou shiken), attend the Legal Training and Research Institute and pass the practical exam (nikai shiken or shihou shushusei koushi).

=== Netherlands and Flanders ===
The traditional academic system of the Netherlands provided the basic academic diploma, propaedeuse, and three academic degrees: kandidaat (the lowest degree), depending on gender doctorandus or doctoranda (drs.) (with equivalent degrees in engineering – ir. and law – mr.) and doctor (dr.). After successful completion of the first year of university, the student was awarded the propaedeutic diploma (not a degree). In some fields, this diploma was abolished in the 1980s. In physics and mathematics, the student could directly obtain a kandidaats (candidate) diploma in two years. The candidate diploma was all but abolished by 1989. It used to be attained after completion of the majority of courses of the academic study (usually after completion of course requirements of the third year in the program), after which the student was allowed to begin work on their doctorandus thesis. The successful completion of this thesis conveyed the doctoranda/us title, implying that the student's initial studies were finished. In addition to these 'general' degrees, specific titles equivalent to the doctorandus degree were awarded for law: meester (master) (mr.), and for engineering: ingenieur (engineer) (ir.). Following the Bologna protocol the Dutch adopted the Anglo-Saxon system of academic degrees. The old candidate's degree was revived to become the bachelor's degree and the doctorandus (mr and ir degrees) was replaced by master's degrees.

Students can only enroll in a doctorate system after completing a research university level master's degree; although dispensation can be granted on a case-by-case basis after scrutiny of the individual's portfolio. The most common way to conduct doctoral studies is to work as promovendus/assistent in opleiding (aio)/onderzoeker in opleiding (oio) (research assistant with additional courses and supervision), perform extensive research and write a dissertation consisting of published articles (over a period of four or more years). Research can also be conducted without official research assistant status, for example through a business-sponsored research laboratory.

The doctor's title is the highest academic title in the Netherlands and Flanders. In research doctorates the degree is always Ph.D. or dr. with no distinction between disciplines, and can only be granted by research universities.

==== Netherlands ====
Every Ph.D. thesis has to be promoted by a research university staff member holding ius promovendi (the right to promote). In the Netherlands all full professors have ius promovendi, as well as other academic staff granted this right on individual basis by the board of their university (almost always senior associate professors). The promotor has the role of principal advisor and determines whether the thesis quality suffices and can be submitted to the examining committee. The examining committee is appointed by the academic board of the university based on recommendation of the promotor and consists of experts in the field. The examining committee reviews the thesis manuscript and has to approve or fail the thesis. Failures at this stage are rare because promotors generally do not allow work they deem inadequate to be submitted to the examining committee; supervisors and promotor lose prestige among their peers should they allow a substandard thesis to be submitted.

After examining committee approval, the candidate publishes the thesis (generally with DOI: and ISBN indices) and sends it to the examining committee, colleagues, friends and family with an invitation to the public defence. Additional copies are kept in the university library and the Royal Library of the Netherlands.

The degree is awarded in a formal, public, defence session, in which the thesis is defended against critical questions of the "opposition" (the examining committee). Specific formalities differ between universities, for example whether a public presentation is given, either before or during the session, specific phrasing in the procedure, and dress code. In most protocols, candidates can be supported by paranymphs, a largely ceremonial role, although they are formally allowed to take over the defence on behalf of the candidate. Doctoral candidates The actual defence lasts exactly the assigned time slot (45 minutes to 1 hour exactly depending on the university) after which the defence is suspended by the bedel who stops the examination with the Latin phrase "Hora Est" (it is time). Examinations are thus stopped on the clock, frequently mid sentence. Failure during this session is possible, but extremely rare. After formal approval of the thesis and the defence by the examining committee in a closed discussion, the session is resumed and the promotor grants the degree and hands over the diploma to the candidate, and usually congratulates the candidate and gives a personal speech praising the work of the young doctor (laudatio), before the session is formally closed.

Dutch doctors may use PhD behind their name or the uncapitalized dr. before their name. Those who obtained a degree in a foreign country can only use the Dutch title dr. if their grade is approved as equivalent by the Dienst Uitvoering Onderwijs though according to the opportunity principle, little effort is spent in identifying such fraud.

Those who have multiple doctor (dr.) titles may use the title dr.mult. Those who have received honoris causa doctorates may use dr.h.c. before their own name.

The Dutch universities of technology (Eindhoven University of Technology, Delft University of Technology, University of Twente, and Wageningen University) also award a 2-year (industry oriented) Professional Doctorate in Engineering (PDEng), renamed EngD from September 2022 onwards, which does not grant the right to use the dr. title abbreviation. In 2023, a pilot started at universities of applied sciences with a professional doctoral programme, in which the focus is on applying knowledge to improve or solve professional processes or products.

==== Flanders ====
In Belgium's Flemish Community the doctorandus title was only used by those who actually started their doctoral work. Doctorandus is still used as a synonym for a Ph.D. student. The licentiaat (licensee) title was in use for a regular graduate until the Bologna reform changed the licentiaat degree to the master's degree (the Bologna reform abolished the two-year kandidaat degree and introduced a three-year academic bachelor's degree instead).

=== Poland ===
In Poland, an academic degree of doktor 'doctor' is awarded in sciences and arts upon an examination and defence of a doctoral dissertation. As Poland is a signatory to the Bologna Process, doctoral studies are a third cycle of studies following the bachelor's (licencjat) and master's (magister) degrees or their equivalents. (Note: E.g. lekarz 'physician' is an equivalent of a master's degree awarded in medicine.) Doctoral student is known as doktorant (masculine form) or doktorantka (feminine form). Doctorate is awarded within specified branch and discipline of science or art by university or research institute accredited by the minister responsible for higher education. The title is abbreviated to dr in nominative case.

Doctors may further undergo the habilitation process.

=== Russia ===
Introduced in 1819 in the Russian Empire, the academic title Doctor of the Sciences (Russian: Доктор наук) marks the highest academic level achievable by a formal process.

The title was abolished with the end of the Empire in 1917 and revived by the USSR in 1934 along with a new (lower) complementary degree of a Candidate [Doctor] of the Sciences' (Russian: Кандидат наук). This system has been used since with minor adjustments.

The Candidate of the Sciences title is usually seen as roughly equivalent to research doctorates in Western countries while the Doctor of the Sciences title is relatively rare and retains its exclusivity. Most "Candidates" never reach the "Doctor of the Sciences" title.

Similar title systems were adopted by many of the Soviet bloc countries.

=== Spain ===
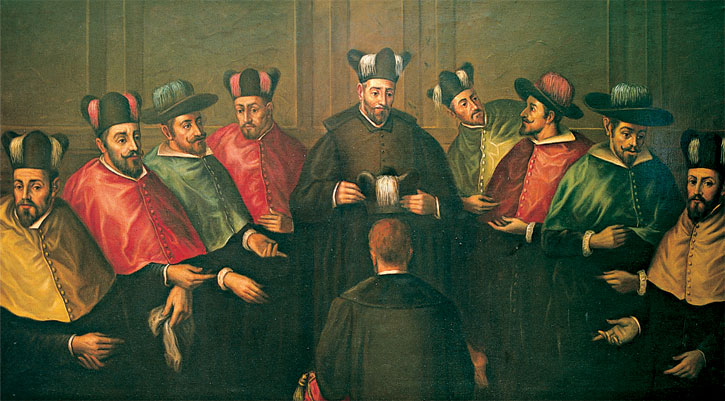
The ancient ceremony of bestowing Complutense's doctoral biretta

Doctoral degrees are regulated by Royal Decree (R.D. 778/1998), or Real Decreto (in Spanish). They are granted by the university on behalf of the king. Its diploma has the force of a public document. The Ministry of Science keeps a national registry of theses called TESEO. According to the National Institute of Statistics (INE), fewer than 5% of M.Sc. degree holders are admitted to Ph.D. programmes.

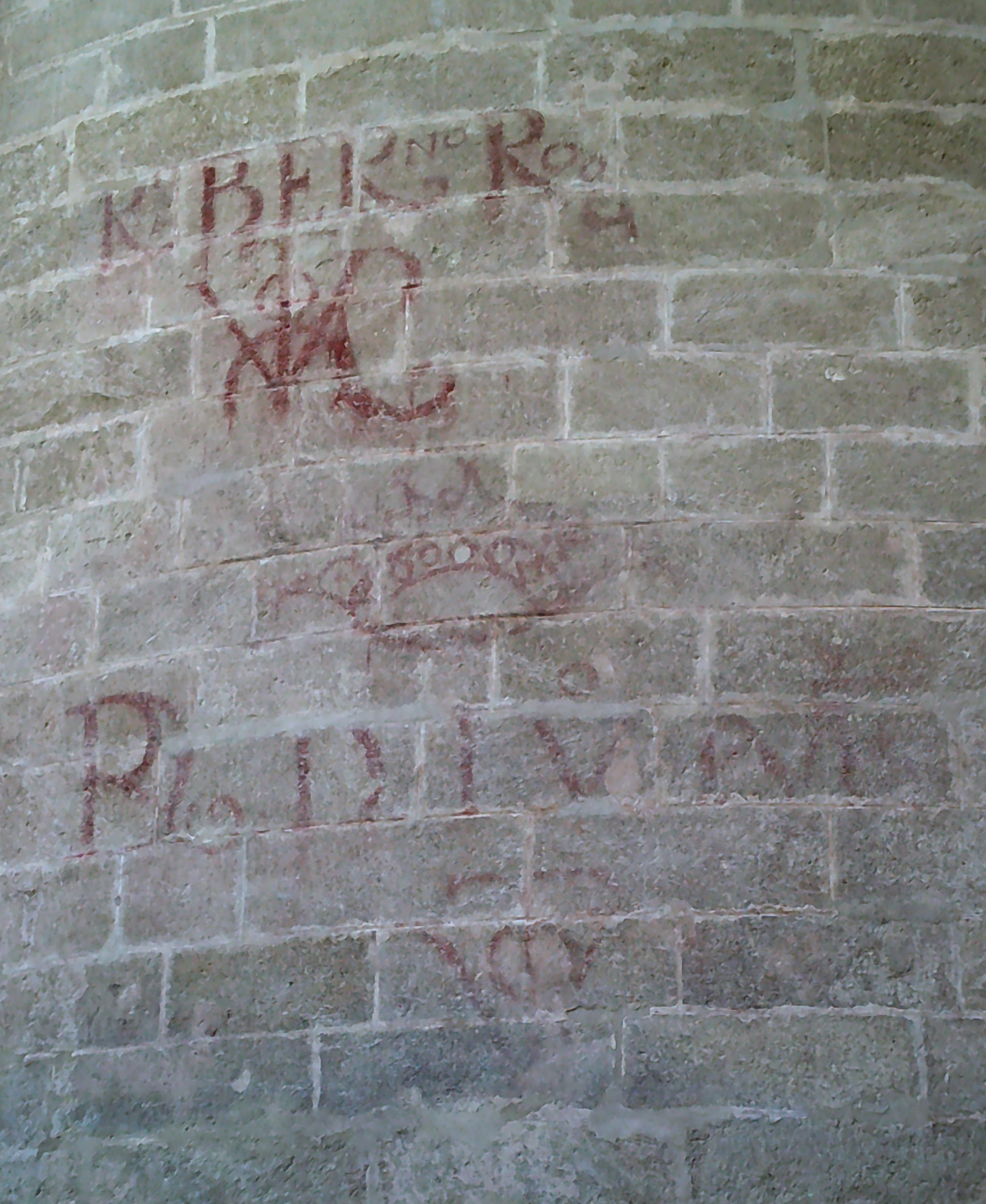
Traditionally, the friends of a new Doctor honored him by painting a victor on the walls (in this case, the Seville Cathedral).

All doctoral programs are research-oriented. A minimum of 4 years of study is required, divided into 2 stages:

- A 2-year (or longer) period of studies concludes with a public dissertation presented to a panel of 3 Professors. Upon approval from the university, the candidate receives a Diploma de Estudios Avanzados (part qualified doctor, equivalent to M.Sc.). From 2008 it is possible to substitute the former diploma by a recognized master program.
- A 2-year (or longer) research period includes extensions for up to 10 years. The student must present a thesis describing a discovery or original contribution. If approved by their thesis director, the study is presented to a panel of 5 distinguished scholars. Any Doctor attending the public defense is allowed to challenge the candidate with questions. If approved, the candidate receives the doctorate. Four marks used to be granted: Unsatisfactory (Suspenso), Pass (Aprobado), Remarkable (Notable), "Cum laude" (Sobresaliente), and "Summa cum laude" (Sobresaliente Cum Laude). Those Doctors granted their degree "summa cum laude" were allowed to apply for an "Extraordinary Award".

Since September 2012 and regulated by Royal Decree (R.D. 99/2011) (in Spanish), three marks can be granted: Unsatisfactory (No apto), Pass (Apto) and "Cum laude" (Apto Cum Laude) as maximum mark. In the public defense the doctor is notified if the thesis has passed or not passed. The Apto Cum Laude mark is awarded after the public defense as the result of a private, anonymous vote. Votes are verified by the university. A unanimous vote of the reviewers nominates Doctors granted Apto Cum Laude for an "Extraordinary Award" (Premio Extraordinario de Doctorado).

In the same Royal Decree the initial 3-year study period was replaced by a research master's degree (lasting one or two years; professional master's degrees do not grant direct access to Ph.D. programs) that concludes with a public dissertation called Trabajo de Fin de Máster or Proyecto de Fin de Máster. An approved project earns a master's degree that grants access to a Ph.D. program and initiates the period of research.

A doctorate is required in order to teach at a university. Some universities offer an online Ph.D. model.

Only Ph.D. holders, Grandees and Dukes can sit and cover their heads in the presence of the King.

From 1857, Complutense University was the only one in Spain authorised to confer the doctorate. This law remained in effect until 1954, when the University of Salamanca joined in commemoration of its septcentenary. In 1970, the right was extended to all Spanish universities.

All doctorate holders are reciprocally recognised as equivalent in Germany and Spain (according to the "Bonn Agreement of November 14, 1994").

=== United Kingdom ===
==== History of the UK doctorate ====
The doctorate has long existed in the UK as, originally, the second degree in divinity, law, medicine and music. But it was not until the late 19th century that the research doctorate, now known as the higher doctorate, was introduced. The first higher doctorate was the Doctor of Science at Durham University, introduced in 1882. This was soon followed by other universities, including the University of Cambridge establishing its ScD in the same year, the University of London transforming its DSc from an advanced study course to a research degree in 1885, and the University of Oxford establishing its Doctor of Letters (DLitt) in 1900.

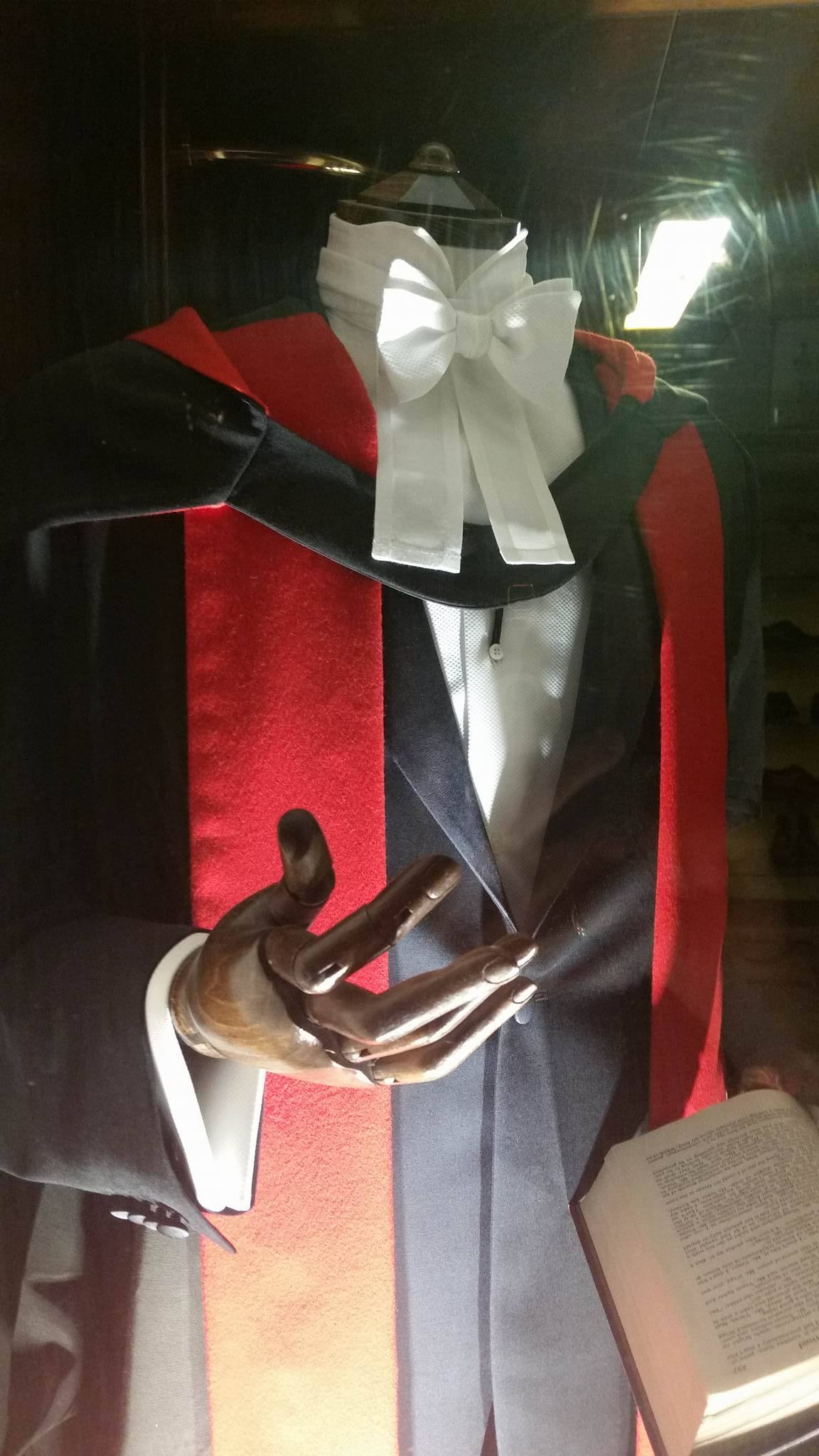
Ph.D. Gown, University of Cambridge

The PhD was adopted in the UK following a joint decision in 1917 by British universities, although it took much longer for it to become established. Oxford became the first university to institute the new degree, although naming it the DPhil. The PhD was often distinguished from the earlier higher doctorates by distinctive academic dress. At Cambridge, for example, PhDs wear a master's gown with scarlet facings rather than the full scarlet gown of the higher doctors, while the University of Wales gave PhDs crimson gowns rather than scarlet. Professional doctorates were introduced in Britain in the 1980s and 1990s. The earliest professional doctorates were in the social sciences, including the Doctor of Business Administration (DBA), Doctor of Education (EdD) and Doctor of Clinical Psychology (DClinPsy).

==== British doctorates today ====
Today, except for those awarded honoris causa (honorary degrees), all doctorates granted by British universities are research doctorates, in that their main (and in many cases only) component is the submission of an extensive and substantial thesis or portfolio of original research, examined by an expert panel appointed by the university. UK doctorates are categorised as:

Doctorates
1. Subject specialist research – normally PhD/DPhil; the most common form of doctorate
  - Integrated subject specialist doctorates – integrated PhDs including teaching at master's level
2. Doctorates by publication – PhD by Published Works; only awarded infrequently, usually to qualified staff members of a given university if they do not already hold a doctorate
3. Professional / practice-based / practitioner doctorates – e.g. EdD, ProfDoc/DProf, EngD, etc.; usually include taught elements and have an orientation that combines professional and academic aspects
Higher doctorates
e.g. DD, LLD, DSc, DLitt; higher level than doctorates, usually awarded either for a substantial body of work over an extended period or as honorary degrees

The Quality Assurance Agency states in the Framework for Higher Education Qualifications of UK Degree-Awarding Bodies (which covers doctorates but not higher doctorates) that:

Doctoral degrees are awarded to students who have demonstrated:

- the creation and interpretation of new knowledge, through original research or other advanced scholarship, of a quality to satisfy peer review, extend the forefront of the discipline, and merit publication
- a systematic acquisition and understanding of a substantial body of knowledge which is at the forefront of an academic discipline or area of professional practice
- the general ability to conceptualise, design and implement a project for the generation of new knowledge, applications or understanding at the forefront of the discipline, and to adjust the project design in the light of unforeseen problems
- a detailed understanding of applicable techniques for research and advanced academic enquiry

In the UK, the doctorate is a qualification awarded at FHEQ level 8/level 12 of the FQHEIS on the national qualifications frameworks. The higher doctorates are stated to be "A higher level of award", which is not covered by the qualifications frameworks.

==== Subject specialist doctorates ====
These are the most common doctorates in the UK and are normally awarded as PhDs. While the master/apprentice model was traditionally used for British PhDs, since 2003 courses have become more structured, with students taking courses in research skills and receiving training for professional and personal development. However, the assessment of the PhD remains based on the production of a thesis or equivalent and its defence at a viva voce oral examination, normally held in front of at least two examiners, one internal and one external. Access to PhDs normally requires an upper second class or first class bachelor's degree, or a master's degree. Courses normally last three years, although it is common for students to be initially registered for MPhil degrees and then formally transferred onto the PhD after a year or two. Students who are not considered likely to complete a PhD may be offered the opportunity to complete an MPhil instead.

Integrated doctorates, originally known as 'New Route PhDs', were introduced from 2000 onwards. These integrate teaching at master's level during the first one or two years of the degree, either alongside research or as a preliminary to starting research. These courses usually offer a master's-level exit degree after the taught courses are completed. While passing the taught elements is often required, examination of the final doctorate is still by thesis (or equivalent) alone. The duration of integrated doctorates is a minimum of four years, with three years spent on the research component.

In 2013, Research Councils UK issued a 'Statement of Expectations for Postgraduate Training', which lays out the expectations for training in PhDs funded by the research councils. In the latest version (2016), issued together with Cancer Research UK, the Wellcome Trust and the British Heart Foundation, these include the provision of careers advice, in-depth advanced training in the subject area, provision of transferable skills, training in experimental design and statistics, training in good research conduct, and training for compliance with legal, ethical and professional frameworks. The statement also encourages peer-group development through cohort training and/or Graduate schools.

==== Higher doctorates ====
Higher doctorates are awarded in recognition of a substantial body of original research undertaken over the course of many years. Typically the candidate, who must first be a graduate or academic staff member of the said university of several years standing, submits a collection or portfolio of previously published, peer-refereed work, together with a commentary explaining how their submission ties together over a substantial research theme, which is reviewed by a committee of internal and external academics who decide whether the candidate deserves the doctorate. Usually an examination fee is required, with the examiners examining the whole body of work submitted rather than a single thesis. For Doctors of Music, the traditional form of submission is a large body of musical compositions within a portfolio plus commentary, though some universities may allow for other forms of work to be submitted rather than purely musical compositions.

The higher doctorate is similar in some respects to the habilitation in some European countries. However, the purpose of the award is significantly different. While the habilitation formally determines whether an academic is suitably qualified to be a university professor, the higher doctorate does not qualify the holder for a position but rather recognises their contribution to research.

Higher doctorates were defined by the UK Council for Graduate Education (UKCGE) in 2013 as:

an award that is at a level above the PhD (or equivalent professional doctorate in the discipline), and that is typically gained not through a defined programme of study but rather by submission of a substantial body of research-based work.

In terms of number of institutions offering the awards, the most common doctorates of this type in UKCGE surveys carried out in 2008 and 2013 were the Doctor of Science (DSc), Doctor of Letters (DLitt), Doctor of Law (LLD), Doctor of Music (DMus) and Doctor of Divinity (DD); in the 2008 survey the Doctor of Technology (DTech) tied with the DD. The DSc was offered by all 49 responding institutions in 2008 and 15 out of 16 in 2013 and the DLitt by only one less in each case, while the DD was offered in 10 responding institutions in 2008 and 3 in 2013. In terms of number of higher doctorates awarded (not including honorary doctorates) the DSc was most popular, but the number of awards was very low: the responding institutions had averaged an award of at most one earned higher doctorate per year over the period 2003–2013.

Award of substantive higher doctorates remain relatively rare, due to many people not being aware of them or due to the fact that people think they are only given out as honorary degrees on graduation day. This has led to many institutions no longer offering/awarding them as substantive degrees. Those that do still offer them often do not openly advertise or promote them due to the costs of having to examine for them as well as the lack of interest in them from academic staff members who might view holding a professorship the pinnacle of their careers rather than holding a higher doctorate.

==== Honorary degrees ====
Most British universities award degrees honoris causa to recognise individuals who have made a substantial contribution to a particular field. Usually an appropriate higher doctorate is used in these circumstances, depending on the candidate's achievements. However, some universities differentiate between honorary and substantive doctorates, using the degree of Doctor of the University (D.Univ.) for these purposes, and reserve the higher doctorates for formal academic research.

==== Lambeth degrees ====
These degrees are substantive, not honorary, degrees awarded by the Archbishop of Canterbury in their own right under previous Papal authority and existing UK legislation. Usually, higher doctorates are awarded.

=== United States ===
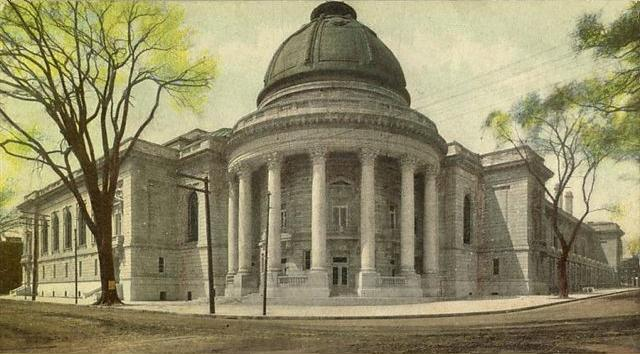
In 1861, Yale University awarded the first Doctor of Philosophy (Ph.D.) degree in the United States.

U.S. research doctorates are awarded for advanced study followed by successfully completing and defending independent research presented in the form of a dissertation. Professional degrees may use the term "doctor" in their titles, such as Juris Doctor and Doctor of Medicine, but these degrees rarely contain an independent research component and are not research doctorates. Law school graduates, although awarded the J.D. degree, are not normally addressed as "doctor". In legal studies, the Doctor of Juridical Science is considered the equivalent to a Ph.D.

Many American universities offer the PhD followed by a professional doctorate or joint PhD with a professional degree. Often, PhD work is sequential to the professional degree, e.g., a PhD in law after a JD or equivalent, in physical therapy after a DPT, and in pharmacy after a Pharm.D. Such professional degrees are referred to as an entry-level doctorate program, while the Ph.D. is a post-professional doctorate.

==== Research degrees ====
The most common research doctorate in the United States is the Doctor of Philosophy (Ph.D.). This degree was first awarded in the U.S. at the 1861 Yale University commencement. The University of Pennsylvania followed in 1871, with Cornell University (1872), Harvard (1873), Michigan (1876) and Princeton (1879) following suit. Controversy and opposition followed the introduction of the Ph.D. into the U.S. educational system, lasting into the 1950s, as it was seen as an unnecessary artificial transplant from the German educational system, which corrupted a system based on England's Oxbridge model.

Ph.D.s and other research doctorates in the U.S. typically entail successful completion of coursework, passing a comprehensive examination, and defending a dissertation.

The median number of years for completion of U.S. doctoral degrees is seven. Doctoral applicants were previously required to have a master's degree, but many programs accept students immediately following undergraduate studies. Many programs gauge the potential of applicants to their program and grant a master's degree upon completion of the necessary course work. When so admitted, the student is expected to have mastered the material covered in the master's degree despite not holding one, though this tradition is under heavy criticism. Successfully finishing Ph.D. qualifying exams confers Ph.D. candidate status, allowing dissertation work to begin.

The International Affairs Office of the U.S. Department of Education has listed 18 frequently awarded research doctorate titles identified by the National Science Foundation (NSF) as representing degrees equivalent in research content to the Ph.D.

==== Professional degrees ====
Many fields offer professional doctorates (or professional master's degrees) for fields such as engineering, pharmacy, and medicine that require such degrees for professional practice or licensure. Some of these degrees are also termed "first professional degrees", since they are the first field-specific master's or doctoral degrees.

A Doctor of Engineering (DEng) is a professional oriented research degree considered equivalent to a PhD. However a PhD in Engineering includes original theory-based research while DEng degrees focus on applied research solutions. DEng students defend their dissertation or praxis at the end of their study before a committee in order to be conferred a degree.

A Doctor of Pharmacy is awarded as the professional degree in pharmacy replacing a bachelor's degree. It is the only professional pharmacy degree awarded in the US. Pharmacy programs vary in length between four years for matriculants with a B.S./B.A. to six years for others.

In the twenty-first century professional doctorates appeared in other fields, such as the Doctor of Audiology in 2007. Advanced Practice Registered Nurses were expected to completely transition to the Doctor of Nursing Practice by 2015, and physical therapists to the Doctor of Physical Therapy by 2020. Professional associations play a central role in this transformation amid criticisms on the lack of proper criteria to assure appropriate rigor. In many cases master's-level programs were relabeled as doctoral programs.

== Revocation ==
In the US doctoral degrees can be revoked or rescinded by the university that awarded them. Possible reasons include plagiarism, criminal or unethical activities of the holder, or malfunction or manipulation of academic evaluation processes. In the Netherlands it had long been unclear whether a university can revoke a doctoral degree as this is not explicitly mentioned in the education laws. However, in an appeal to the revocation of a degree in 2017, the high court of the Netherlands ruled in 2024, that if the candidate has consciously committed fraud the granting university can indeed revoke a degree.

== See also ==
- Compilation thesis
- Doctor (title)
- Habilitation thesis
- List of fields of doctoral studies
- Postdoctoral researcher
