= Doctor of Social Science =

Advanced academic degree

The Doctor of Social Science (DSocSci, SScD, Dr. rer. soc. or DSS) degree is the highest degree offered by some universities in the field of social sciences, for which other universities confer a Ph.D.

Like the PhD, it is recognized as a terminal research degree that requires a substantial original thesis.

In North America, the only universities to offer a Doctor of Social Science are Royal Roads University in British Columbia, Canada, and Wilmington University in New Castle, Delaware, United States.

== Argentina ==
Provided by the National University of Luján

== Australia ==
Provided by the University of Queensland

Provided by the University of Sydney

== Canada ==
Provided by Royal Roads University

== Finland ==
Provided by the University of Tampere

Provided by the University of Helsinki and at which, somewhat infelicitously, the terminal degree in Practical philosophy is awarded as a Doctor of Social Science (DSS), rather than a Doctor of Philosophy (Ph.D.).

== Germany ==
Provided e.g. by the University of Mannheim and by the Ludwig-Maximilians-Universität München.

== Holy See ==
Provided by the Pontifical Gregorian University.

== Hong Kong ==
Provided by the University of Hong Kong.

== Ireland ==
The DSocSci is offered as a full-time qualification by:

- University College Cork
- Maynooth University

== United Kingdom ==
The DSocSci is offered as a full-time or part-time qualification by:

- Formerly offered by the University of Bristol, but abolished.
- The University of Leicester
- The Queen's University Belfast

== United States ==
- Formerly Offered by The New School for Social Research, but abolished
- Wilmington University, New Castle, Delaware
