= Commission on Accreditation of Healthcare Management Education =

US-based non-profit organization

- Formation: January 1, 1968
- Type: Healthcare Program Accreditation
- Headquarters: Spring House, Pennsylvania, U.S.
- Location: Nationwide
- Members: 8 corporate members
- Leader: Anthony Stanowski
- Staff: 12
- Website: www.cahme.org

The Commission on Accreditation of Healthcare Management Education (CAHME) is the accrediting body for graduate programs in healthcare management in the United States and Canada. It is based in Spring House, Pennsylvania, and is a 501(c)(3) non-profit organization.

Founded in 1968 as the Accrediting Commission on Education for Health Services Administration (ACEHSA), it adopted its current name in 2004 to reflect a change in strategic direction. This came after its 2001 Orlando Forum, a meeting funded by the Kellogg Foundation and the Robert Wood Johnson Foundation and called to examine management and leadership preparation practices in the U.S. healthcare industry. As a result of the meeting, a task force was appointed, with representatives of the practice and academic communities. The task force recommended changes in the accreditation process, and the name of the organization was changed.

CAHME has been granted recognition by the Council on Higher Education Accreditation (CHEA) to accredit master's level-healthcare management programs in the United States. It also accredits programs in Canada and in 2018 has expanded to accredit programs outside of North America. CAHME works closely with its corporate members—Association of University Programs in Health Administration, American College of Healthcare Executives, Healthcare Financial Management Association, Cedars Sinai Medical Center, Medical Group Management Association, National Association for Healthcare Quality, Studer Community Institute, American Hospital Association—to establish the standards for healthcare management education

The most recent revision of the CAHME accreditation standards was published in 2021.

== See also ==
- Doctor of Health Administration
- Master of Health Administration
- Upsilon Phi Delta
