= List of physiotherapy schools in Australia =

To train as a physiotherapist in Australia, someone typically has to complete one of the following: a four-year bachelor's degree in physiotherapy (potentially with the final year being treated as an honours year); a master's degree by coursework in physiotherapy; or an extended master's degree in physiotherapy (called a Doctor of Physiotherapy). Australian National University, Deakin University, Edith Cowan University, Murdoch University, Queensland University of Technology, Southern Cross University, Torrens University Australia, University of New England, University of the Sunshine Coast, University of Western Australia and the University of Wollongong do not offer any entry-level physiotherapy qualifications.

== Table ==
Physiotherapy schools in Australia
University	Location(s)	Degree(s) (Note: Only single degrees, or double degrees whose physiotherapy degree component(s) is not available as a single degree.)
Australian Catholic University	Ballarat, Brisbane and Sydney	BPhysio, MSpExPhysio (online only), MPhil and PhD.
Bond University	Gold Coast	DPhysio (Note: Can be studied as part of a joint Bachelor of Exercise and Sports Science and Doctor of Physiotherapy program.)
Charles Darwin University	Darwin	BHealthSc/MPhysio.
Charles Sturt University	Albury-Wodonga, Orange and Port Macquarie	BPhysio.
Central Queensland University	Bundaberg, Cairns and Rockhampton.	BPhysio (Hons).
Curtin University	Perth	BSc(Physio) (Hons), MClinPhysio and DPhysio.
Federation University Australia	Churchill	BPhysio.
Flinders University	Port Pirie, Renmark and Mount Gambier	BAllHealth(Physio) (Note: Pending formal accreditation according to reference as of 13 February 2024.) and MPhysio. (Note: A joint bachelor and master's programme is available at Flinders that goes for 5 years full-time.)
Griffith University	Brisbane and Gold Coast	BPhysio and BPhysio (Hons).
James Cook University	Townsville	BPhysio, GCertRehab(Physio), (Note: Only offered online) GDipRehab(Physio), MRehab(Physio), MPhil and PhD.
La Trobe University	Bendigo and Melbourne	BPhysio (Hons), MMuscPhysio, MPhysioPrac, MSpExPhysio, MAppSc(Res) and PhD.
Macquarie University	Sydney	DPhysio.
Monash University	Melbourne	BPhysio (Hons) and DPhysio.
RMIT University	Melbourne	MPhysio.
Swinburne University of Technology	Melbourne	MPhysio.
University of Adelaide	Adelaide	BPhysio (Hons).
University of Canberra	Canberra	BPhysio and MPhysio.
University of Melbourne	Melbourne	GCertClinRehab(Physio), GCertPhysio, GDipClinRehab(Physio), MClinRehab(Physio), MPhysio and DPhysio.
University of New South Wales	Sydney	BExSc/MPhysioExPhys, MRes and PhD.
University of Newcastle, Australia	Newcastle	BPhysio (Hons).
University of Notre Dame Australia	Broome, Fremantle and Sydney	BPhysio (Fremantle only), MSc(Physio), MPhysio (Fremantle only), MPhil, DPhysio(Res) (Note: Professional doctorate.) and PhD.
University of Queensland	Brisbane	BPhysio (Hons), MPhysio and MPhysioSt.
University of South Australia	Adelaide	BPhysio (Hons), GCertAdvClinMuscSpPhysio, MAdvClinPhysio, MPhysio, MRes and PhD.
University of Southern Queensland	Ipswich	AAllHealth(Physio), BPhysio (Hons), MRes and PhD.
University of Sydney	Sydney	BAppSc(Physio) and DPhysio.
University of Tasmania	Launceston	MPhysio
University of Technology Sydney	Sydney	MPhysio and MPhysio(Res).
Victoria University	Melbourne	MPhysio (Note: An undergraduate-entry joint Bachelor of Applied Movement Sciences and Master of Physiotherapy exists.)
Western Sydney University	Sydney	BPhysio and BPhysio (Hons)
