= Physical therapy education =

Patient care by country

Physical therapy education varies greatly from country to country. Worldwide, physical therapy training ranges from basic work site education in hospitals and outpatient clinics to professional doctoral degree and masters programs.

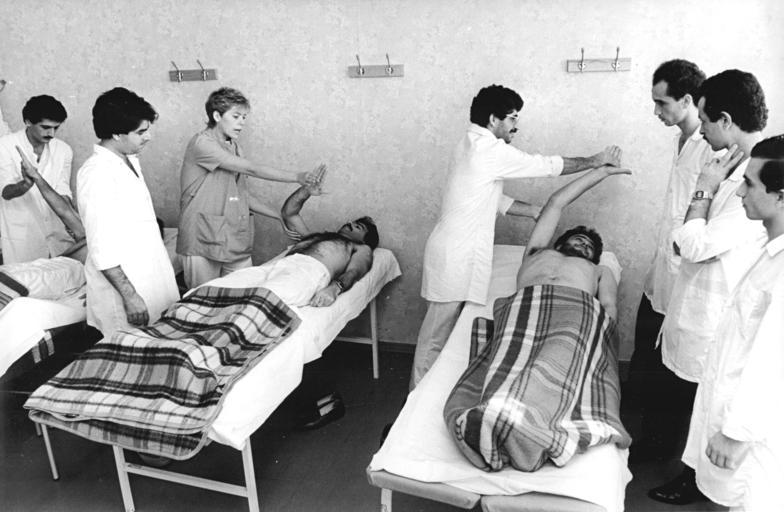
Physical therapy education in the 1980s

== Africa ==
=== North Africa ===
==== Egypt (Middle East) ====
In Egypt, physical therapy is a vital form of professional patient care that can be applied in most disciplines of medicine. A total of 266 credit hours are to be completed through ten semesters (5 years) before graduation and the study is in English. This is followed by a 12-month internship at the university and other educational hospitals before interns are allowed to register as physical therapists. New applicants are required to have an interview with the college dean.

Physical therapy is taught at the following governmental and private Physical Therapy Faculties: Cairo University, Kafr-Elshakh University, Bni-swaif University, South Valley University, Delta University for Science and Technology, Hours University in Egypt, Misr University for Science and Technology, Egyptian Chinese University, October 6 University, Pharos University, MTI University, BUC University, and Deraya University.

=== Sub-Saharan Africa ===
==== Nigeria ====
In Nigeria, Physiotherapy training is a 5-year Bachelor of Physiotherapy (BPhysio) or Bachelor of Medical Rehabilitation (BMR) degree programme. A 1-year clinical internship program under the supervision of senior and experienced clinician physiotherapists is required upon graduation from an accredited University before the new graduate can be licensed to practice as a physiotherapist. The first training program in Nigeria was started at the University of Ibadan in 1966, followed by the University of Lagos in 1971. A training program was also started at the University of Ife (now Obafemi Awolowo University) in 1978, the University of Nigeria, Enugu Campus in 1987, Bayero University, Kano in 1989, University of Maiduguri, Maiduguri in 2003. Other training programs are also available at the University of Maiduguri and the Nnamdi Azikiwe University, Nnewi. Advanced Master's and Doctor of Philosophy degrees in physiotherapy (MSc Physio and Ph.D.) are available at the University of Ibadan, the University of Lagos, Obafemi Awolowo University, and the University of Nigeria, Enugu Campus. Presently, the Nigeria Society of Physiotherapy (Professional body representing Nigerian physiotherapists) and the Medical Rehabilitation Therapists (Registration) Board (the Government body that regulates the training and practice of rehabilitation therapy professionals in Nigeria) are making plans to transit the Nigerian entry-level Bachelor's programs to entry-level Doctorate programs. Presently the Doctor of Physiotherapy (DPT) entry-level has been approved by the National university commission (NUC) and is expected to commence in Nigerian universities soon.

==== South Africa ====
In South Africa physiotherapists are First line practitioners (i.e. health professionals who can autonomously diagnose and treat), can refer patients to medical practitioner specialists and X-Ray imaging and issue a certificate of illness. There are eight schools of physiotherapy, usually attached to the corresponding medical school.

The bachelor's degree (B.PhysT, B.Sc.(Physio) or B.Physio) consists of four years of general practice training, involving all aspects of the discipline. Typically, the first year comprises largely theoretical ("basic sciences") instruction, while the second includes a focus on human anatomy and physiology. Gradually, time spent in supervised practice increases until the fourth year, in which the student generally spends about 80% in practice. In their final year, students are also expected to complete various research projects, which fulfill the requirements of an Honours degree. At the postgraduate level, several of the universities offer course work-based master's degrees (MPhysT, M.Sc. (Physio)) focused on a specific area of practice, and including a "mini-dissertation". Research-based degrees are the M.Sc. and Ph.D. (Physio).

After graduation, professional practice can only be entered into after completing a state-governed, compulsory year of community service. Practicing physiotherapists are also required to register with the Health Professions Council of South Africa, the registering body for physiotherapists being the Professional Board for Physiotherapy, Podiatry and Biokinetics. They are often required to be trained in advanced life support for emergencies in their departments and private practices.

==== Uganda ====
Training physiotherapists in Uganda started in 1972. This three-year diploma course is still running at the Uganda Institute of Allied Health and Management Sciences (previously Mulago Paramedical Training School).

The first degree-level course at a public institution was started at Mbarara University of Science and Technology in 2012.

All graduates need to be registered with the Uganda Allied Health Professionals Council and then can work as autonomous practitioners in both private and government health facilities.

== Asia and the Pacific ==
=== South Asia ===
==== Bangladesh ====
In Bangladesh, the Bachelor of Science in physiotherapy (BPT) course is provided by the Medicine Faculty of the University of Dhaka, University of Rajshahi, Jashore University of Science and Technology and Gono University.

The BPT curriculum includes Anatomy, Physiology, Biochemistry, Pathology and microbiology, Biomechanics, Radiology and imaging, Orthopedics & Rheumatology, Paediatric, Pharmacology, Neurology, Kinesiology, Electrotherapy, Therapeutic Exercise, Community Medicine, Psychology, Cardiopulmonary, General Surgery, Research Methodology, Geriatric, Psychiatry, Sports Physiotherapy, Orthopedic Medicine, Professional Ethics and Management, Teaching Methodology, Rehabilitation Medicine (Disability & Development), Prosthetics & Orthotic and Research Project. This curriculum has designed so that graduate physiotherapists can practice independently and autonomously in their clinical field.

Physical Therapy or Physiotherapy institutes in Bangladesh:

- National Institute of Traumatology Orthopaedic and Rehabilitation (NITOR) (government institute)
- Bangladesh Health Professions Institute (private)
- State College of Health Sciences (SCHS) (private)
- The Institute of Health Technology (IHT) – Dhaka (government)
- Institute of Health Technology (IHT) – Rajshahi (government)
- Gono Bishwabidyalay (GONO University) (private)
- SAIC Institute of Medical Technology (SIMT) (private), which provide five years of professional education including a one-year mandatory internship.
- Daffodil Health Institute (DHI) (private) offers B Sc in Physiotherapy, B Sc in Occupational Therapy and B Sc in Speech and Language Therapy Courses under the University of Dhaka.

Peoples University Of Bangladesh was the pioneer in private sector but they stopped all health Science courses due to some unexpected legal problems.

Two institutes are offering post graduation in Physiotherapy. Gono Bishwabidyalay (GONO University) is offering the only clinical Master of Physiotherapy (MPT) and BHPI is offering a non-clinical postgraduate MSc.Pt.Bangladesh Open University launched Master's of Disability Management and Rehabilitation (M.D.M.R) under the school of Science and Technology in 2018.Bangladesh Physical Therapy Association is the only trade organization of Bangladeshi physical therapists. Another organization recognized under social Ministry is named Bangladesh Physiotherapy Association working as a social welfare organization. Bangladesh Physiotherapy Association received international recognition from WCPT (2007).

Just after liberation war Bangladesh started three-year Physiotherapy Graduation course in 1972. It was initiated by Professor Dr R J Garst first time at National Institute of Traumatology & Orthopaedic and Rehabilitation (NITOR).

In Bangladesh most of the physical therapists are using prefix of Dr and suffix as PT. Bangladesh Government passed "Bangladesh Rehabilitation Council Bill, 2018 in the Jatiya Sangsad.

Bangladesh Rehabilitation Council (BRC) is the government regulatory body for physiotherapy and rehabilitation professionals of Bangladesh. The body regulates and provides registration to professionals, professional education, practice, and services in Bangladesh.

==== India ====
In India, universities offer diploma, bachelor's, master's and PhD in physiotherapy. Diploma course is usually three years and the enrollment has reduced since the introduction of Bachelor's in Physiotherapy (BPT) in the early 1990s in India. Most students with diploma has opted for lateral entry to Bachelor programme.

Bachelor in Physiotherapy (BPT) is a four and half year undergraduate program in physiotherapy with six months of mandatory clinical internship, typically conducted on a rotational basis across various medical specialties such as orthopedics, neurology, cardiovascular care, pediatrics, geriatrics, and community health. The BPT curriculum is structured to closely mirror international standards, offering subjects such as anatomy, physiology, biomechanics, pharmacology, and therapeutic exercises, ensuring that graduates are well-prepared to practice both independently and within multidisciplinary teams.

Graduates are trained not only in clinical skills but also in critical thinking and patient management, enabling them to address a wide range of physical ailments. However, due to the absence of a unified National Council overseeing physiotherapy education, there is significant variation in the BPT syllabus across different states in India.

After the graduation Physiotherapist (PTs') could go for further specialization in cardiovascular and pulmonary physiotherapy, Community Physiotherapy, Neurology, Musculoskeletal, Hands, Sports, Obs-Gynaecology, or undertake Research.

PTs in India use the title 'Doctor' and prefix it before their name with a suffix P.T. (Physiotherapist) so as to make their stand clear they are not medicine doctors. However, the use of the title 'Dr' according to the IAP (Indian Association of Physiotherapist) and IACP (Indian Association of Chartered Physiotherapists) is by tradition and convention and is used in the same manner as it is used by the MBBS/MS/BDS/MDS/BHMS/BAMS/BNYS/BUMS degree holders. PTs argue that they are not breaching any law prevailing in India as legally only one who has earned a degree in MD/DM or Phd is justified to use and prefix the 'Doctor' title.

There are well over 250 colleges offering undergraduate program in physiotherapy (BPT) and more than 50 colleges offering masters in Physiotherapy (MPT) with two years' duration. MUHS (Maharashtra) and some other universities in India run a 3-year MPT postgraduate degree. PhD in Physiotherapy is also offered in some selected universities of the states Maharashtra, Karnataka and Tamil Nadu and Delhi.

A.M.U. Aligarh started Diploma in Physiotherapy & Rehabilitation very early but they did not upgrade it yet.

IACP (Indian Association of Chartered Physiotherapists) is providing Post graduation Certificates (Cert.NMD, Cert.SPM) and Diplomas in online and offline modes.

Delhi Pharmaceutical Sciences and Research University offers a bachelors course in Physiotherapy with an annual intake of about 50 students. The university is also equipped with an outpatients department.

Jamia Hamdard took the lead in starting Post-Graduate course in Physiotherapy and Occupational Therapy in North India in 1998. The courses were very well received and are in great demand. The Faculty receives help and active support from the renowned hospitals in Delhi for training the students, besides utilizing Majeedia Hospital. The Jamia is in the process of constructing a separate building for the Faculty of Allied Health Sciences with the help of generous grant from the UGC. The Faculty offers Masters and Bachelors programmes of study in Occupational Therapy and Physiotherapy.

Rajiv Gandhi University of Health sciences[RGUHS], Karnataka quite famous for its Physiotherapy standard offers Bachelor of Physiotherapy [B.P.T], and Masters of Physiotherapy in following specializations Master of Physiotherapy in Musculoskeletal Disorders and Sports (MPT-MSS), Master of Physiotherapy in Neurological and Psychosomatic Disorders (MPT-NPD), Master of Physiotherapy in Cardio-Respiratory Disorders (MPT-CRD), Master of Physiotherapy in Community Physiotherapy (MPT-CP.), Master of Physiotherapy in Pediatrics (MPT-Ped.).

All India Institute of Medical Sciences, Singhania University, Jamia Millia Islamia, Rajiv Gandhi University of Health Sciences[RGUHS], Karnataka and many other universities are offering PhD in physiotherapy.

==== Pakistan ====
In Pakistan there are 20 colleges offering DPT, many universities including NUR International University, University of Health Sciences and Riphah International University are offering DPT, 2 universities are offering M.Phil. in Physiotherapy and 2 universities offering PhD in physiotherapy. Physiotherapists have a good scope in government and private hospitals and they are awarded 17 grade pay scale. In this way Pakistan has become the third country offering DPT in the world.

==== Sri Lanka ====
In Sri Lanka, since the year 2006, the University of Peradeniya and the University of Colombo have offered undergraduate courses in physical therapy education. Since the year 2013 in General sir John Kotelawala Defence University has also offered this course.

There are only few PG specialised Physiotherapists available in the country like Geeth Kumara- MPT(MSS- Musculoskeletal and sports), Esther Liyanage- MPT(MSS) Musculoskeletal and sports, D.K.Anthony - MPT (CP - Community Physiotherapy)...etc.

=== East Asia ===
==== China ====
Four-year programs in physical therapy are available throughout China, and there are a growing number of occupational and speech-pathology programs. The integration of Western and traditional Chinese physical therapy is one of the main characteristics of this type of program.

==== Hong Kong ====
In 1978, the Hong Kong Polytechnic first offered higher diploma programme in Physiotherapy under the Institute of Medical and Health Care (IMHC), Hong Kong Polytechnic. In 1991, the PT programme was converted to the Bachelor of Science degree programme (BSc programme). In Hong Kong, the Hong Kong Polytechnic University and Tung Wah College provide full-time degree in physiotherapy.

==== Japan ====
There are more than 180,000 physiotherapists and more than 270 schools of physiotherapy in Japan.

==== Taiwan ====
In Taiwan, the first physical therapy program was launched in 1967 at National Taiwan University. Current entry-level physical therapist educational programs include a 6-year undergraduate curriculum (Doctor of Physical Therapy, DPT) in two universities (National Taiwan University and National Yang-Ming University) and a 4-year undergraduate curriculum (Bachelor of Science in Physical Therapy) in 11 universities. There are also three junior colleges to provide a five-year program (Associate of Science). Clinical internship is required in the final year of all programs mentioned above. Once a student graduates from the PT program, he/she is then required to pass a national licensure exam administered by the Ministry of Examination, Taiwan, for clinical practice. Several universities also offer graduate programs in physical therapy, rehabilitation, or related disciplines at the master or doctoral level.

=== Western Asia and the Middle East ===
==== Iran ====
In Iran, the physical therapy degree is offered in bachelor level and master's and PhD level, which usually takes four years for BSc and 2 year for MSc, 4 year for PhD.

==== Iraq ====
College of Medical and Health technology-Baghdad has a graduate program in physical therapy, 4-year period after high school. Summer training courses in many hospitals (graduation requirement). 2nd physical therapy department is present in Erbil Technical Health College/ Erbil Polytechnic university. also now they open master study in physiotherapy. 3rd department present in Cihan University in Erbil, this year they will have 1st graduation. 4th department present in Health science college/ Hawler Medical university also in erbil, they have until 3rd stage, no graduation until now.

==== Jordan ====
In Jordan, a physiotherapist at diploma level can still practice. However, such diploma programmes are not offered any more. Practitioners at diploma level are encouraged to bridge their degree into B.Sc. in physiotherapy in order to get financial and professional benefits. Three universities are currently offering this degree: University of Jordan, Jordan University of Science and Technology and Hashemite University. B.Sc. in Physiotherapy programmes take four years that include clinical component. No internship is required from students to start practice upon graduation. Currently M.Sc. are available in Jordan University of Science and Technology, while PhD programmes in physiotherapy are not available. However, students can register in others medical master's degrees like 'anatomy',' physiology', and 'public health'.

=== Kuwait ===
In Kuwait, physical therapy B.Sc. degrees can be obtained after graduating from Kuwait University (four-year program). Students learn to assess patients and document their progress in their second year of study and start going on to hospitals to have their practical learning beginning at the start of their third year. After graduating further training in hospitals is available. There are no formal post-graduation programs.

=== Turkey ===
In Turkey, the Physiotherapy (BPT) education is provided by physiotherapy schools in universities (Hacettepe University, Gazi University, Dokuz Eylül University, Istanbul University, Marmara University, Istanbul Medipol University, Başkent University, Pamukkale University, Süleyman Demirel University, Bezmialem Foundation University, Acıbadem University, Trakya University, Yeni Yüzyıl University) after high school education. Education takes four years or five years with prep classes. M.Sc. and Ph.D. education is given by institutes of medical sciences.

=== United Arab Emirates ===
In the United Arab Emirates the Bachelor Of Physiotherapy (BPT) consists of a four-year undergraduate degree program. In the first year of the program they are introduced to pre-clinical subjects such as Anatomy, Physiology, Biochemistry, Human Behaviour & Socialisation & Basic Medical Electronics & Computers. The students also get hands-on experiences in cadaveric dissections while learning Human Anatomy during the first year of the program. The students progressively are introduced to supervised clinical practice and the integrated curriculum offers the best learning experiences in addition to extensive in-house elearning programs. The course offers Case Based Learning experiences and focuses on Evidence Based Practices. The program culminates with a six-month internship ending with a research project work.

=== Oceania ===
==== Australia ====
In Australia, a few different programs are available at both undergraduate and post graduate level. The physiotherapy degree can be undertaken over a four-year period as an undergraduate or two to three years post graduate with the early components being predominantly theoretical including basic anatomy, biology, physics, psychology, kinesiology, goniometry and physiology. In the latter half of the degree students partake in practical components focusing on musculoskeletal physiotherapy, neuromuscular physiotherapy, paediatric physiotherapy, geriatric physiotherapy, cardiothoracic physiotherapy, and women's health. The program generally progresses with an increasingly clinical focus and usually the final year involves practical placements at clinics, and research. Australian programs include the B.Physio, B.App.Sc.Physio, B.Sc.Physio, M.Physio, or D.Physio degrees.

==== New Zealand ====
In New Zealand, there are currently two schools of physiotherapy offering four-year undergraduate programs. Many New Zealand physiotherapists work in the private health care system as musculoskeletal physiotherapists and the curriculum reflects the need to prepare graduates for autonomous practice. Students follow an educational program similar to Australia with an emphasis on biomechanics, kinesiology and exercise. Postgraduate study typically involves three years of subject specific learning. The New Zealand Society of Physiotherapists Incorporated (NZSP) is the professional body that physiotherapists may optionally be a member of in New Zealand.

== North America ==
=== Canada ===
In Canada, entry-level physiotherapy education is offered at 14 universities. All of these university programs are at the Master's level, meaning that applicants must have already completed an undergraduate degree prior to applying. Many universities also offer graduate programs in physiotherapy, rehabilitation, or related disciplines at the masters or doctoral level. Many physiotherapists may advance their education at these levels in such Clinical Practice Areas as cardiorespiratory, geriatrics, neurosciences, orthopaedics, pediatrics, rheumatology, oncology, sports physiotherapy, and women's health.

==== Quebec ====
In the province of Quebec, physiotherapists are required to complete a master's degree specializing in physiotherapy to meet the eligibility criteria to gain membership with the Ordre professionnel de la physiothérapie du Québec. However, physiotherapy students must first obtain a bachelor's degree majoring in physiotherapy to submit their application to the master's program, which will provide them with several internships in hospitals or rehabilitation centers. Some students may even have the opportunity to be trained in European countries. Following the completion of a master's degree, most often named "Master of Science" or "Master of Physical Therapy," one may pursue studies at the doctoral level in such fields as rehabilitation, kinesiology, or exercise science. universities offer physiotherapy programs. The Université de Montréal and the Université de Sherbrooke offer a joint bachelor's and master's degree program that leads to the obtention of a Bachelor of Science and a Master of Science. McGill University's School of Physical and Occupational Therapy and the Université Laval both offer the Bachelor of Physical Therapy at the undergraduate level and the Master of Physical Therapy at the graduate level.

=== United States ===
In the United States, curricula for Physical Therapists and Physical Therapist Assistants are accredited by the Commission on Accreditation in Physical Therapy Education (CAPTE). While currently 226 of the 227 programs offer the Doctor of Physical Therapy degree, there are still many physical therapists currently practicing in the US who were trained with a Bachelor of Science (BSPT) or Master of Physical Therapy degree. According to the American Physical Therapy Association, the number of DPT programs offered in the US rose from 19 out of 212 accredited programs (along with 184 MSPT and 9 BSPT programs) in 2000, to 222 out of 227 programs in 2011. According to the 2020 U.S. News & World Report, the best PT programs in America are: University of Delaware, University of Pittsburgh, Washington University in St. Louis, Northwestern University, University of Iowa, University of Southern California, Duke University, Emory University, Creighton University, MGH Institute of Health Professions, Ohio State University, University of North Carolina Chapel Hill, Marquette University, University of Alabama Birmingham, and University of Colorado. Doctoral programs utilize different teaching strategies to prepare students for direct access care. Strategies include, case-based studies, role playing, practical examinations and computer assisted learning.

Physical Therapist Assistants typically graduate with an Associate of Applied Science degree. As of August 2011, there were 276 accredited two-year (Associate degree) programs for Physical Therapist Assistants In the United States.

After graduating an accredited program, PTs and PTAs are required to pass the National Physical Therapy Examination (NPTE) before they can obtain a license to practice. Each state regulates physical therapy licenses independently, so precise requirements for licensure and renewal vary from state to state.

Physical Therapist education includes clinical internships that normally occur toward the end of the professional degree. Clinical internship allows students to incorporate their critical thinking skills, hands-on practice, and professional behaviors into actual clinical scenarios. During this time, the doctoral intern will rotate between different settings for a given time period of a month or more. For example, a doctoral intern may have a rotation in orthopedics during one month and then in wound care the next month. This would continue in different settings for a predetermined amount of time, which is usually around a year. Throughout these rotations the student is paired with a clinical instructor. The role of the clinical instructor is to supervise the student as they apply the knowledge and skills learned in the classroom. In order to become a clinical instructor, one has to be a practicing Physical Therapist for at least one year. After graduating from an accredited program and becoming licensed, a Doctor of Physical Therapy may continue his or her education by entering a residency and then fellowship. Residencies and fellowships are not required at this time, but are becoming more common in physical therapy education. Currently there are 162 residencies and fellowships in the United States.

== Europe ==
=== France ===
In France, the physiotherapist is known as masseur-kinésithérapeute. The diploma is recognised and delivered by the French Ministry of Health and is called the diplôme d'Etat de masseur-kinésithérapeute (State diploma of physiotherapist). It is a master's degree since 2021 and the last Macron's reform of higher health studies: studies for physiotherapy are now five years long including one year of selection PASS / L.AS and four years of formation. Studies have two cycles: a first cycle of three years (Bachelor's degree) with first year PASS/L.AS and then first two years of formation, and a second cycle of two years (Master's degree) with last two years of formation. Until 2020, it was a bachelor's degree because year of selection was not recognised although it was mandatory. The kinésithérapeute is a paramedical profession in France but it is slowly becoming medical as it shares the same entrance gate in health studies as medicine, pharmacy, odontology and midwifery and is an autonomous social security approved professionnel de santé (Health professional), but still not a doctor. Some discussions are opened with the Ministry of Health to create a Doctor of Medicine in physiotherapy in France, with a third studies cycle and a physiotherapy internship. But State diploma of physiotherapist holders can now go in PhD of rehabilitation sciences with the gratitude of master's degree.

=== Italy ===
In Italy, known as "Laurea in Fisioterapia (abilitante alla professione sanitaria di Fisioterapista)", it is a three-year full-time degree taught in the Faculty of Medicine of many Italian Universities. The course is an intensive mix of class time and mandatory internship right from the first year. Internship is such an important part that the number of hours dedicated to practice progressively increases reaching half of the program by the third year. There are no special requirements to be admitted to the bachelor's degree; students from various backgrounds can access the program, previous passing an 80 question pre selection test. This test is implemented to all those courses known as "numero chiuso" or close access to limit the number of participants. Depending on the Faculty and course between 30 and 400 positions are available each year. To be selected one has not only pass the examination but finish in the top positions required to enter. For all para-medical degrees each Institution can select its own test which it held simultaneously in all Universities, whereas for Medicine the test are administered by the Ministry of Education.

Importance is given to the initial exam and a "close number" is paramount. This maneuver is intended to control the job market, hence providing secure occupation to those who finish.

Yet between 2010 and 2011 the public funds to national health care were cut drastically, resulting in a national wide job loss and impossibility for newly formed students to be hired, contemporary to a large portion of the population in need of medical care yet unable to pay for the private service, which is regulated with minimum fees by imposition of law, therefore not allowing that portion of unemployed physiotherapists to lower their own fees so to offer their services and provide that portion of the population with the needed assistance.

=== Republic of Ireland ===
In the Republic of Ireland, Physiotherapy is available as an undergraduate course in four universities, Trinity College, University College Dublin, Royal College of Surgeons and University of Limerick. Courses are four years in length with clinical practice in the final two years. Students are required to complete 1000 hours of clinical practice before graduation.

=== Malta ===
In Malta, Physical Therapy B.Sc. (honours) is available as a course which can be obtained after finishing a four-year course at the Institute of Health Care of the University of Malta. This course involves all aspects of Physiotherapy. Students have an intensive three-year theoretical course after whom s/he spends the last year doing clinical placements (four years in total). Students learn how to assess and treat patients. To be able to secure a license to practice as a physiotherapist, one must be able to pass some practical exams which involves both assessment and treatment. In the fourth year, students are also expected to complete a physiotherapy research project, which fulfills the requirements of an Honours degree.

=== Spain ===
In Spain a physiotherapy student is required to complete three years of training after having passed a university entrance exam. After completing a physiotherapy program, another exam can be taken to work for the public health system of an autonomous community, or a graduate can work for private hospitals, clinics, etc. There are 43 universities with physiotherapy faculties in Spain. Since 2009 physiotherapy has become a four-year career. Physiotherapists who have finished their three years of training can also take one more year.

=== United Kingdom ===
In the United Kingdom, pre-registration undergraduate and postgraduate Physiotherapy degree courses are offered by thirty five universities. Undergraduate degree programs are three years in duration in England, Wales and Northern Ireland and four years in Scotland, whilst pre-registration master's degrees are spread over two extended academic years. The difference in the length of degree courses within Scotland compared to the rest of the UK, reflects the nature of the education system within that country and the content of all UK degree programs is essentially the same. All courses are approved by the Chartered Society of Physiotherapy and the UK Health and Care Professions Council - the latter allowing registration and entitlement to use the protected title of Physiotherapist upon successful completion of the degree program. All physiotherapy degree courses consist of a mix of theoretical and practical teaching sessions and include a compulsory 1000 hours of clinical practice spread across each of the academic years. Pre-registration Physiotherapy training consists of advanced study within each of three distinct areas of UK Physiotherapy practice - Musculoskeletal, Neurological and Cardio-respiratory care. Typical entry requirements for undergraduate degree courses are three academic GCE 'A' Level courses (or equivalents) at grades between ABB - AAA dependent upon the higher education institution. Postgraduate programs require a degree within a relevant subject (e.g. Biology, Anatomy and Physiology etc.) with a minimum grade of an upper second class honours.

=== Residency ===
A residency is usually undertaken after the student completes a Doctor of Physical Therapy degree and passes the initial licensure exam. A Residency continues physical therapy education with evidence based training to better equip the resident to be able to help the patients that they will serve. A residency is a specialty designed to advance the residents knowledge in evaluation, examination, diagnosis, prognosis, intervention, and management of patients within the given subset of patients. Residencies for a Doctor of Physical Therapy are between 9 and 36 months and must be completed within a minimum of 1,500 hours. Residencies may involve community service, research, patient education, teaching opportunities, and the supervision of other health care providers. Residencies are currently offered in Cardiovascular and Pulmonary, Clinical Electrophysiology, Geriatrics, Neurology, Orthopaedics, Pediatrics, Sports, Women's Health, and Wound Care. Residencies prepare the Doctor to become a board-certified clinical specialist through the American Board of Physical Therapy Specialties (ABPTS). Residency- and Fellowship-trained physical therapists report practicing more imaging skills (i.e. utilizing evidence-based guidelines) compared to their counterparts.

=== Fellowship ===
A fellowship is designed to provide greater evidence based knowledge in a speciality or subspecialty. To gain acceptance to a fellowship a physical therapist must have one or more of the following qualifications 1) Completion of a residency 2) Board Certified Specialist certification 3) Demonstrate clinical skills within a particular speciality area. Fellowships must be completed between 6 and 36 months and completed with a minimum of 1000 hours. Fellowships are offered in Hand Therapy, Movement Science, Neonatal, Orthopaedic Manual Physical Therapy, and Sports-Division 1 Athletics. Those individuals who complete post doctoral residencies and fellowships are more marketable as specialized practitioners.
