= Philip Rea =

Philip Rea may refer to:

- Philip A. Rea, British biochemist, science writer and educator
- Philip Rea, 2nd Baron Rea, British peer, politician and merchant banker
