= DHSC =

DHSC may refer to:

- Department of Health and Social Care of the United Kingdom
- Department of Health and Social Care (Isle of Man)
- DHSC (football club) of Utrecht, Netherlands
- Doctor of Health Science (D.H.Sc.)
