= Bitrus Gani-Ikilama =

Nigerian professor of physiotherapy (1944–2011)

- Born: 25 February 1944; Donga, Northern Region, British Nigeria (now Donga, Taraba State, Nigeria)
- Died: 20 February 2011 (aged 66); Zaria, Kaduna State, Nigeria
- Education: Royal National Institute for the Blind, London, United Kingdom
- Occupation: Physiotherapist
- Years active: 1967–2011
- Known for: First blind child in Nigeria to be enrolled in the School for the Blind, Gindiri
- Spouse(s): Omoze Aigbe (m. 1973, died), Taiwo Olufunto (m. 1983)
- Children: Andrew
- Awards: OON, FCSP, MNSP

Bitrus Gani-Ikilama (25 February 1944 – 20 February 2011) was a Nigerian professor of physiotherapy. He became visually impaired as a child. At the apex of his career, he was made the head of the Physiotherapy Department, Ahmadu Bello University Teaching Hospital, Zaria, Nigeria.

== Early life and career ==
Gani-Ikilama was born on 25 February 1944, in Donga, Northern Region (now in Taraba State), Nigeria. After contracting measles, he lost his eyesight at the age of five.

In 1955, young Gani-Ikilama became Nigeria's first blind child to be enrolled at primary school level in the School for Blind Children, Gindiri (now in Plateau State), where he graduated in 1957. In 1958, he also became the first blind teenager to be admitted into the Boys' Secondary School, Gindiri.

Between 1963 and 1967, Gani-Ikilama was a student in the School of Physiotherapy at the Royal National Institute for the Blind, School of Physiotherapy, London, United Kingdom. Upon graduating, he returned to Nigeria and became a registered member of the Chartered Society of Physiotherapy. He faced challenges with potential employers who doubted his abilities as a blind man. However, in 1967, he was employed first at the Lagos University Teaching Hospital, where he began working as a physiotherapist for six years. In 1973, he moved to the Ahmadu Bello University Teaching Hospital (ABUTH) as an employee.

In 1976, Gani-Ikilama played a key role in producing the first tape recording services for the Nigerian blind. It became a success story. The organisation grew larger as a lot of people flocked in to ask for services. Braille production, guidance and counselling, consultancy, and vocational training were added to the services in 1979. The organisation got renamed to Hope for the Blind Foundation.

At ABUTH, he rose to become the chief physiotherapist and head of the department and retired in 2009.

=== Positions held ===
- General Practice Physiotherapist, Lagos University Teaching Hospital, 1967–1973;
- Senior Physiotherapist in-charge, Orthopaedics, Lagos University Teaching Hospital, 1971–1973;
- Senior Physiotherapist, Physiotherapy Department, Ahmadu Bello University Teaching Hospital, Zaria, 1973–1974;
- Superintendent/Physiotherapist in-charge, 1975–1977;
- Principal Physiotherapist I/ag. Head, Physiotherapy Department, Institute of Health, Zaria, 1977–1979;
- Assistant Chief Physiotherapist/Head, Physiotherapy Department, 1979–1981;
- Chief Physiotherapist/Head, Physiotherapy Department, Ahmadu Bello University Teaching Hospital, Zaria, since 1974;
- Chair, O.M. Trust Limited;
- National Vice President, Nigeria Society of Physiotherapy, 1977, 1987–1988;
- President, Nigeria Society of Physiotherapy, 1988–1989;
- Chair, Hope for the Blind, 1983–2011

=== Evangelical ministry ===
While he lived, Gani-Ikilama took the gospel of Jesus Christ to mostly Moslem-dominated areas of northern Nigeria through evangelism.

== Personal life ==
In 1973, Gani-Ikilama married Omoze Aigbe, a doctor, who died a few years later. He then married Taiwo Olufunto (née Akinluyi), also a doctor, on 9 April 1983. Together, they had six children, of whom only three survived. As of 2017, his son, Andrew Gani-Ikilama, was the executive director of Knowledge for the Blind Initiative (KBI), a non-governmental organisation working to alleviate the suffering of blind people.

== Awards ==
Gani-Ikilama was a recipient of many awards like Officer of the Order of the Niger (OON), Fellow of the Nigerian Society of Physiotherapists (NSP), and the Nigerian Government Icon of Hope (2002).

=== Other awards ===
- Molex Foundation Gold Medal Award for Fortitude, 1984
- Meritorious Award through Trinity College of Ministerial Arts, 1989
- Meritorious Award through Trinity College of Ministerial Arts, 1987
- FNSP, 1998

=== Membership ===
- Chartered Society of Physiotherapy, London, since 1967;
- World Confederation of Physical Therapy, since 1969

=== Fellowships ===
- Nigeria Society of Physiotherapy, since 1998

== Publications ==
During his lifetime, Gani-Ikilama made over 10 publications, including:

- Physiotherapy Practice in Underdeveloped Condition, Association of Blind Chartered Physiotherapist Journal, 1968;
- Occupational Opportunities for the Blind – A Survey "Nigerian society of Ophthalmology Conference, Ibadan, 1983;
- Reading for Disabled Child, World Organisation for Early Childhood Education (OMEP) Conference, Zaria, 1985.

== Demise ==
Gani-Ikilama died on 20 February 2011, five days before his 67th birthday.
