= Bachelor of Science in Public Health =

Undergraduate degree

The Bachelor of Science in Public Health (BSPH) (or Bachelor of Public Health) is an undergraduate degree that prepares students to pursue careers in the public, private, or non-profit sector in areas such as public health, environmental health, health administration, epidemiology, nutrition, biostatistics, or health policy and planning. Postbaccalaureate training is available in public health, health administration, public affairs, and related areas.

The Council on Education for Public Health includes undergraduate public health degrees in the accreditation review of public health programs and schools.

== See also ==
- Master of Health Administration
- Master of Public Health
- Upsilon Phi Delta
