= Rachael L. Morton =

Australian health economist

Rachael L. Morton is an Australian academic, Professor and Principal Research Fellow of Health Economics in the Faculty of Medicine and Health at the University of Sydney. Morton is an international leader in the economic evaluation of chronic kidney disease and melanoma.

== Education and Career ==
Morton graduated with a PhD from the University of Sydney in 2011.

Morton is currently Director of Health Economics & Health Technology Assessment and deputy director of the NHMRC Clinical Trials Centre.

Board Director, Australian Clinical Trials Alliance (ACTA) 2018–2024; Past President, Heath Services Research Association Australia and New Zealand (HSRAANZ); Program Chair - International Health Economics Association (IHEA); Health Economists' Study Group UK (HESG).

== Health Economics Research ==
Morton is an international leader in the economic evaluation of chronic kidney disease and melanoma prevention, diagnosis, and treatment.

Morton's research has had a major influence on funding policy (US Medicare & Medicaid) for dialysis payments and chronic kidney disease; Australian Medicare providing economic evidence for new MBS items. Her research has changed international clinical practice guidelines in melanoma (UK, US, Germany, Brazil, Australia) kidney disease (Kidney Disease Improving Global Outcomes [KDIGO] guidelines, CARI [Australia]), for transplantation and end-of-life care; and infectious diseases through the European Centre for Disease Control [EU].

== Awards and recognition ==
In 2013 Morton won an NHMRC Sidney Sax Fellowship to Oxford University.

In 2019 CI Morton won the Distinguished Investigator award for Health Services Research.

In 2024, Morton won the ACTA Trial of the Year, Health Economics Alongside Trials (HEAT) Excellence award for her high impact cost-effectiveness analysis of a melanoma prevention strategy using personalised genomics.

Additionally in 2024, Morton was a winner in the Eureka Science Prize – Aspire Scholarship Excellence in Interdisciplinary Scientific Research, for the ACRF Australian Centre for Excellence in Melanoma Imaging and Diagnosis.

== Top Publications ==
- The views of patients and carers in treatment decision making for chronic kidney disease: a systematic review and thematic synthesis of qualitative studies. BMJ.
- Chronic Kidney Disease. The Lancet.
- Cost-Effectiveness of Skin Surveillance Through a Specialized Clinic for Patients at High Risk of Melanoma. Journal of Clinical Oncology.
- The effectiveness and cost-effectiveness of screening for latent tuberculosis among migrants in the EU/EEA: a systematic review. Euro Surveillance.
- Impact of CKD on Household Income. Kidney International Reports.
- Incorporating carbon into health care: adding carbon emissions to health technology assessments. The Lancet Planetary Health.
- The Symptom Monitoring with Feedback Trial (SWIFT): Protocol for a registry-based cluster randomised controlled trial in haemodialysis. Trials.
- Patient- reported outcome measures (PROMs) to guide clinical care: recommendations and challenges. MJA.
- Kidney health in the context of economic development. Nature Reviews, Nephrology.
- Expedited transfer from scene for refractory out-of-hospital cardiac arrest: an Australian prospective, multicentre, parallel, open-label randomised clinical trial. Accepted The Lancet Respiratory Medicine. (May, 2025)
