= Master of Health Administration =

Academic degree

The Master of Health Administration, Master of Healthcare Administration (MHA), or Master of Health Management (MHM), is a master's-level professional degree granted to students who complete a course of study in the knowledge and competencies needed for careers in health administration, involving the management of hospitals and other health services organizations, as well as public health infrastructure and consulting. Programs can differ according to setting; although practitioner-teacher model programs are typically found in colleges of medicine, health professions, or allied health, classroom-based programs can be found in colleges of business or public health.

== Structure ==
The degree program is designed to give graduates of health disciplines (in particular) greater understanding of management issues and prepare them for senior management roles, and is awarded by many American, European, Australian, Indian and Sri Lankan (Post Graduate Institute of Medicine – University of Colombo) universities. The degree traditionally focuses on health administration at the local, state, and federal level as well as in the nonprofit sector. This contrasts with the general Master of Business Administration or the Master of Public Administration degrees.

Accredited programs of study typically require students to complete applied experiences as well as course work in areas such as population health, healthcare economics, health policy, organizational behavior, management of healthcare organizations, healthcare marketing and communications, human resource management, information systems management and assessment, operations assessment and improvement, governance, leadership, statistical analysis and application, financial analysis and management, and strategy formulation and implementation.

MHA programs are thus intended to provide students with the essential knowledge required for senior managerial and planning work in the health services and systems sectors. The objectives of the program are to develop graduates who are: competent general and financial managers, competent planners, knowledgeable about public health and the structure, organization and financing of health care systems, knowledgeable about society, law and ethics, and competent in quantitative skills. "Health care is a labor intensive industry, no doubt about it and it’s not likely to change in the near future. Leadership of this human capital is uniquely challenging because of the diversity of both the workforce and the customer base and because of the life and death nature of our work." - Dr. RuthAnn Althaus

In most countries, applicants are required to hold, at minimum, a four-year undergraduate degree and have a minimum period of professional experience in the health system. The curriculum, however, varies between universities.

== United States ==
Although many colleges of business, public health, and/or health sciences in the United States have degrees with health administration content, about one-fourth have been accredited through the Commission on Accreditation of Healthcare Management Education (CAHME), which is the only accreditor recognized by the Council for Higher Education Accreditation for these programs. In the same way the Association to Advance Collegiate Schools of Business (AACSB) evaluates accreditation for Master of Business Administration programs; CAHME accreditation requires programs to meet a set of standards related to areas such as program resources, faculty preparation, curriculum content, and post-graduation career success, and also helps to ensure that the programs are well integrated with the practice communities their graduates will work within.

Applicants to accredited programs are required to hold a four-year undergraduate degree prior to enrolling. Some universities offer dual MBA/MHA degrees with AACSB accreditation, or MBA/HOM degree programs, which may be completed concurrently or sequentially. Some MHA programs do not require professional experience prior to enrollment; however, most programs require work experience, such as internships or fellowships, as part of their graduation requirements. Some MHA programs use a blended lecture and online format, allowing people to continue working while they pursue the MHA degree. There are also a few universities, including many for-profit universities, that offer Master of Healthcare Administration programs completely online; however, these programs are not currently eligible for CAHME accreditation because of concerns about the effectiveness of online programs as an analog for developing interpersonal and team-based skills which are more typically face-to-face in their use in post-graduation professional roles.

Most Master of Healthcare Administration-equivalent graduate programs in the United States are offered by schools of public health, business, allied health, or, less frequently, by schools of medicine. Programs in schools of public health or business tend to have a more 'traditional' structure; courses are typically taught by academicians and have a focus on theory as well as analysis. In the United States, the official academic honor society for Master of Healthcare Administration graduates is Upsilon Phi Delta.

== Australia ==
In Australia, the Master of Health Administration may be divided into two parts; the first part awards a graduate diploma of Health Service Management, and, depending on the outcome, diplomates may be permitted to continue to the second part which culminates in the Master of Healthcare Administration degree. Course structures, and be either research or coursework based. The Master of Health Administration is considered the benchmark qualification by the Australasian College of Health Services Management and the Royal Australasian College of Medical Administrators. Unlike elsewhere, the Master of Healthcare Administration is not intended primarily for medical practitioners (who have courses provided by their professional organisations) but is open to graduates of any discipline wishing to pursue a career in health administration. Owing to the wide variety of course nomenclature in Australia, some universities offer the course as a Master of Business(Health Administration), abbreviated to MBus(Hlth).

== See also ==
- Upsilon Phi Delta
- Master of Public Health
- Master of Business Administration
- Master of Public Administration
- Doctor of Health Administration
