= Health Economists' Study Group =

UK association of health economists founded in 1972

- Abbreviation: HESG
- Formation: 1972
- Founders: Tony Culyer, Alan Williams, Robert Lavers
- Type: Learned society
- Headquarters: United Kingdom
- Members: c. 450
- Website: hesg.org.uk

The Health Economists' Study Group (HESG) is a United Kingdom-based association of health economists. Founded in 1972 by economists at the University of York, it is the oldest organisation of its kind in health economics and played a vital role in establishing health economics as a distinct sub-discipline in the UK. It holds two meetings a year, at which pre-circulated papers are presented by discussants rather than their authors.

== History ==
HESG grew out of a conference on the economics of medical care held at the University of York in 1970, organised on the initiative of Jack Wiseman and jointly sponsored by the Department of Health and Social Security (DHSS). Following an informal meeting in York in July 1972, Tony Culyer, Alan Williams and Robert Lavers wrote to 56 economists identified as working on health care, inviting them to a first meeting. This was held at York on 5–6 October 1972, attended by 26 people, with three papers presented.

In the group's early history, membership was restricted to economists, meetings were capped at around 40 participants, and the group was administered by a single organiser at York. The founders intended it to create a 'critical mass' of health economists, many of whom were the sole economist in a multidisciplinary department, and to bring academics together with civil servants under conditions of confidentiality. The group's twice-yearly meetings were regularly attended by government economists and have been identified as an important mechanism for the transfer of health economics research into government policymaking.

From 1973, HESG received funding from the Social Science Research Council (later the ESRC), supplemented in the early 1980s by a grant from the Nuffield Provincial Hospitals Trust. In 1985 the group became self-funding, introducing an annual membership fee; the introduction of fees is estimated to have roughly halved the membership, and the cap on meeting attendance was removed. Culyer served as organiser until the mid-1980s, succeeded by John Hutton (also at York) and, from 1993, by Cam Donaldson at the Health Economics Research Unit in Aberdeen. During the late 1980s and 1990s, meetings grew in size and the membership became more heterogeneous, with increasing participation by women and by economists based in the National Health Service and industry.

== Meetings and organisation ==
HESG meets twice a year at different locations, mainly in the UK and Ireland. Its meeting format, largely unchanged since the 1970s, involves papers circulated in advance and discussed in sessions led by a chair and a designated discussant, with the author given a right of reply. The group has no formal management structure beyond its organisers; policy is decided at business meetings open to all members. As of 2026, HESG had around 450 members, approximately 10% of them outside the UK, and its Winter 2026 meeting at York attracted 207 delegates from 49 institutions.
