= Philip A. Rea =

British biochemist, science writer and educator

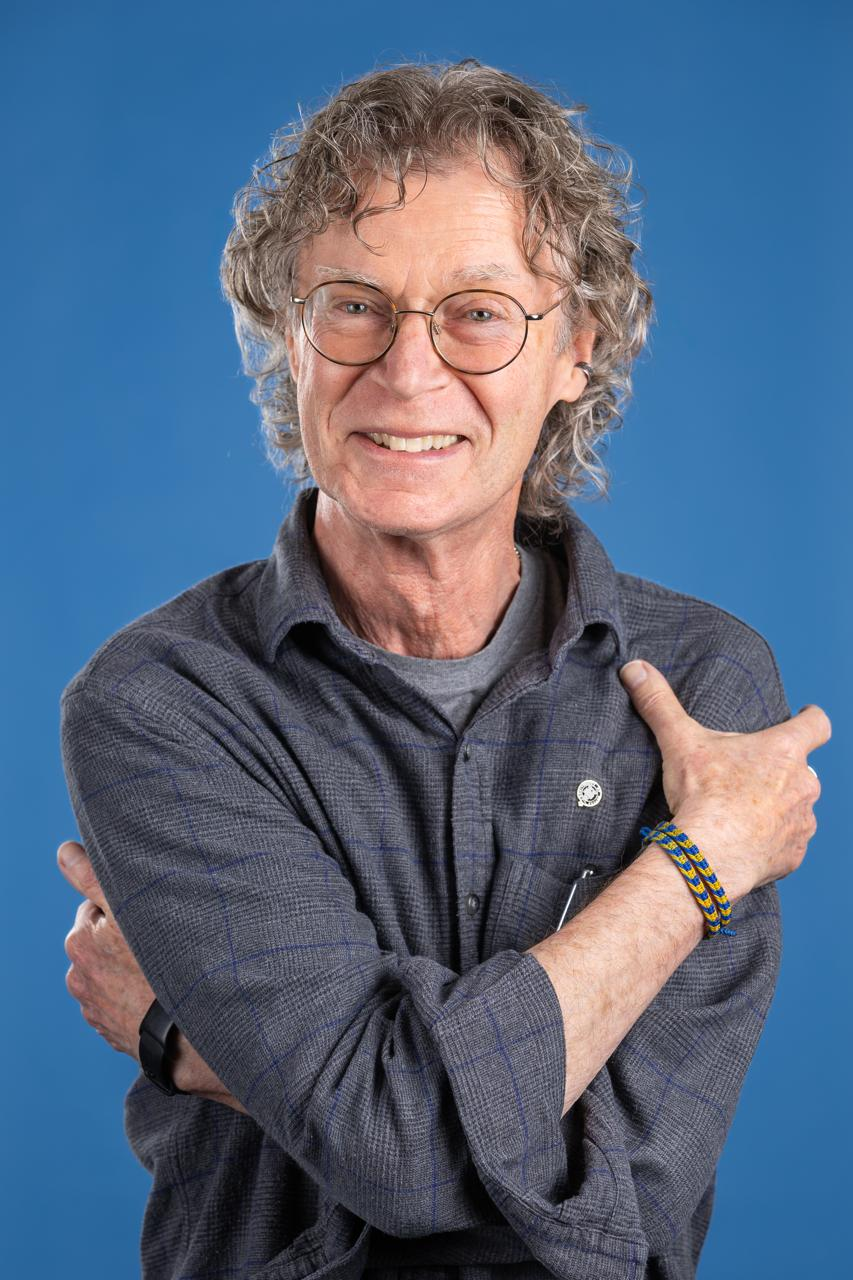
- Born: Wolverhampton, England
- Education: University of Sussex (BSc); Magdalen College, Oxford (DPhil); Magdalen College, Oxford (DSc)
- Awards: Christian R. and Mary F. Lindback Award for Distinguished Teaching (2014) Elected as Fellow of American Association for the Advancement of Science (2013) President's Medal, Society for Experimental Biology (1990)
- Scientific career
- Fields: Membrane biochemistry; molecular enzymology; science journalism; science education
- Workplaces: University of Pennsylvania; Rothamsted Research; University of York; McGill University; University of Oxford

Philip A. Rea is a British biochemist, science writer, and educator. He is currently Professor of Biology and Rebecka and Arie Belldegrun Distinguished Director of the Vagelos Program in Life Sciences & Management at the University of Pennsylvania. His contributions as a biochemist have been in the areas of membrane transport and xenobiotic detoxification, and as a science writer and educator in understanding the intersection between the life sciences and their implementation. In 2005, he and Mark V. Pauly founded the Roy and Diana Vagelos Program in Life Sciences & Management between the School of Arts and Sciences and Wharton School at the University of Pennsylvania, which he continues to co-direct. Rea's work on serendipity in science has been featured in The Wall Street Journal. Additionally, he has served as a subject matter expert for The Scientist.

== Education ==
Rea attended Gartree High School and Beauchamp College, Oadby, Leicester. He earned a BSc in Biological Sciences (First Class Honors) from the University of Sussex in 1978 and a DPhil in Plant Biochemistry from Magdalen College, Oxford in 1982. He was an MRC Research Fellow at the John Radcliffe Hospital, Oxford (1982–1984), a Merit Research Associate at McGill University (1984), and an AFRC Research Fellow at the University of York (1985–1987). Before joining the University of Pennsylvania in 1990, he was a Group Leader at Rothamsted Research.

== Career ==
He began his pioneering studies at Rothamsted Research on plant vacuolar proton pumps and other key transporters involved in plant physiology.

In 1990, Rea joined the University of Pennsylvania as a faculty member in the Department of Biology, where he spent most of his academic career. At Penn, Rea's research expanded to include both plant and animal models.

A key turning point in Rea's career came in 2005, when he co-founded the Roy and Diana Vagelos Program in Life Sciences & Management at the University of Pennsylvania alongside Mark V. Pauly. This unique interdisciplinary program combines the biological sciences with business education.

== Research ==
Rea is known for his research on vacuolar proton (H^{+}) pumps, ATP-binding cassette (ABC) transporters, and phytochelatin (PC) synthase. His early work on plant vacuolar H^{+}-pumping ATPases led to the first definitive subunit composition of these enzymes and helped establish the concept of 'V-type ATPases' (Manolson et al., 1985). These studies, in turn, opened the way for biochemical and molecular investigations of these enzymes from many different sources, leading to recognition that the plant enzyme is just one example of a category of primary H^{+} pumps common to both plant and animal cells. Other contributions made by Rea in this specific area included elucidation of the gross topography of the V-ATPase, demonstrating that its organization is analogous to that of the F-type ATPases of 'energy coupling' membranes (Rea et al. 1987a; Rea et al. 1987b), and purification of the enzyme in its entirety to establish that the holoenzyme is a 12-15 subunit, complex comprising a peripheral, nucleotide-binding V1 sector and an intrinsic, H^{+}-conductive V0 sector (Parry et al. 1989). Collectively, these discoveries provided some of the earliest evidence that V-type and F-type H^{+}-ATPases are paralogous.

=== H^{+}-pumping inorganic pyrophosphatases ===
When Rea entered the field of vacuolar energetics, there were indications that plant vacuolar membranes also contained H^{+}-pumping inorganic pyrophosphatases, which he confirmed by demonstrating that the membrane-associated vacuolar inorganic pyrophosphatase (V-PPase) of plants catalyzes pyrophosphate- (PPi-) energized electrogenic H^{+}- translocation (Rea and Poole 1985) and is both functionally and chromatographically separable from the ATP-energized V-ATPase found on the same membrane (Rea and Poole 1986; Rea and Sanders 1987). What then followed was a broad range of discoveries made by Rea's group concerned with defining the basic organization and core catalytic capabilities of the V-PPase. These included: (1) Purification of the pump, in parallel with identification of the major subunit through its substrate-protectable covalent modification with radiolabeled ligands (Britten et al. 1989); (2) Molecular cloning of the pump (AVP1) from Arabidopsis thaliana (Sarafian et al. 1992), the very first V-PPase to be cloned from any source; (3) In vitro reconstitution of the transport activity of the purified pump (Britten et al. 1992); (4) Definition of the pump as a new category of ion translocase, together with speculations (which were subsequently confirmed) that the D[X]_{7}KXE motif common to both vacuolar and soluble PPases participates directly in catalysis (Rea et al. 1992); (5) Heterologous expression of the pump from Arabidopsis in yeast (Saccharomyces cerevisiae), to demonstrate that the 'substrate-binding subunit' alone is sufficient for PPi-dependent H^{+}-translocation (Kim et al. 1994); (6) Identification of aminomethylenediphosphonate (AMDP) as a potent type-specific inhibitor of the pump from both plant and photosynthetic bacterial sources (Baykov et al. 1993; Zhen et al. 1994); (7) Protein chemical identification of the maleimide-reactive domain of the pump and modeling of the topology of the C-terminal half of the molecule by peptide mapping and the deployment of both membrane-permeant and membrane-impermeant maleimides (Zhen et al. 1994); (8) Identification of acidic residues required for coupling PPi hydrolysis to H^{+}-translocation by the pump (Zhen et al. 1997); (9) Isolation and functional characterization of a thermostable sequence-divergent homolog from the extremophilic archaeon Pyrobaculum aerophilum (Drozdowicz et al. 1999); (10) Molecular identification, isolation and functional characterization of a type II (K^{+}-independent) version of the pump from Arabidopsis and the first demonstration that members of this pump category fall into two distinct classes (Drozdowicz et al. 2000); (11) Comparative genomic analyses of V-PPases to disclose examples of this pump category in all three domains of life and confirm the notion of two paralogous series, typified by the type I and type II enzymes (Drozdowicz et al. 2001); (12) Molecular isolation, functional characterization and cellular localization of a type I pump from the parasitic protist responsible for toxoplasmosis, Toxoplasma gondii (Drozdowicz et al. 2002).

=== ABC transporters ===
Rea's research on ABC transporters has largely focused on members of this superfamily from plant and fungal sources. His group, in collaboration with Dr. Dennis J. Thiele's group (then at the University of Michigan) molecularly and biochemically defined yeast cadmium factor 1 (YCF1), a yeast (S. cerevisiae) MRP- (ABCC-) type ABC transporter to show that it catalyzes the ATP-energized vacuolar uptake of glutathione- (GS-) conjugates (Li et al. 1996). This resulted in the discovery of a new pathway for heavy metal detoxification: YCF1-catalyzed vacuolar sequestration of GS-heavy metal complexes, as exemplified by the bis(glutathionato)cadmium and tris(glutathionato)arsenic complexes formed between glutathione and cadmium (Li et al. 1997) and arsenic, respectively (Ghosh et al. 1999). Using tools developed in the course of their studies of YCF1 for parallel screens for similar functionalities from plant sources, Rea's group was the first to both functionally and molecularly define an ABC transporter from a vascular plant (Arabidopsis thaliana) (Lu et al. 1997; Lu et al. 1998). The ABC transporters identified, AtMRP1 and AtMRP2 (alias AtABCC1 and AtABCC2), were shown to be involved in the ATP-energized vacuolar sequestration and detoxification of both endogenous and exogenous toxins, largely amphipathic anions primarily in the form of GS-conjugates (Lu et al. 1997; 1998; Liu et al. 2001). In compiling the first complete inventory of ABC proteins from a plant source, Rea and colleagues established that these organisms allocate a substantial fraction of their genomes to members of this protein family. The genome of Arabidopsis thaliana, for instance, contains more than 130 ORFs for these proteins of which more than 100 are transmembrane proteins (Sánchez-Fernández et al. 2001; Rea 2007). This gene count far exceeds that of humans and other animals.

=== Phytochelatin synthase ===
It was Rea's group (Vatamaniuk et al. 1999) and two others (Clemens et al. 1999; Ha et al. 1999) that simultaneously and independently first identified genes encoding the enzyme, phytochelatin (PC) synthase responsible for the synthesis of phytochelatins (PCs) by transfer of a γ-Glu-Cys unit from one thiol peptide to another or to a previously synthesized PC for the detoxification of heavy metals. Thereafter, he and his colleagues: (1) Defined the basic catalytic mechanism and mode of activation of the enzyme by heavy metals by establishing that blocked thiols are sufficient for PC synthase-catalyzed transpeptidation of glutathione (GSH) and related thiol peptides via a substituted enzyme mechanism (Vatamanaiuk et al. 2000); (2) Determined that PC synthase is a dipeptidyl transferase that forms an enzyme γ-Glu-Cys acyl-intermediate during catalysis (Vatamaniuk et al. (2004); (3) Demonstrated that PC synthase is a distant cousin of papain-like cysteine proteases and deploys a Cys-His-Asp catalytic triad to catalyze the dipeptidyl transferase reaction through the formation of a γ-Glu-Cys-thioester intermediate (Rea et al. 2004; Romanyuk et al. 2006); results that were subsequently independently confirmed by crystallographic analyses of a PC synthase homolog from the cyanobacterium Nostoc sp. PCC 7120 (Vivares et al. 2005; Rea 2006). One of the most surprising findings to come from the cloning of PC synthase and its equivalents from other plants and the fungus Schizosaccharomyces pombe was the discovery of a similar gene in an animal. Routine database searches disclosed a homologous single-copy gene (ce-pcs-1) in the genome of the nematode Caenorhabditis elegans, which Rea and colleagues took a step further to demonstrate that CePCS1 is a PC synthase, and that targeted suppression of ce-pcs-1 by the double-stranded RNA interference (RNAi) technique confers a cad1-like heavy metal-hypersensitive phenotype on C. elegans (Vatamaniuk et al. 2001; Vatamaniuk et al. 2002). While other gene products had been inferred to contribute to heavy metal tolerance in C. elegans, CePCS1 was the first for which a firm biochemical basis for the effects seen at the level of the whole organism was established.

=== Life sciences research implementation ===
Rea's current research, which owes its origins to his leadership of the Vagelos Program in Life Sciences & Management, focuses on case studies of the interface between life sciences research and its implementation; the difficult transition from discovery in the laboratory to success in the market and/or toward the expansion of humanitarian efforts. Examples of such case studies are 'Statins: from fungus to pharma,' 'Ivermectin and river blindness,' 'Can skinny fat beat obesity?', and 'Metformin: out of the backwaters and into the mainstream'; four articles aimed primarily at the educated non-specialist. The book Managing Discovery: Harnessing Creativity to Drive Biomedical Innovation (2018), coauthored with Mark V. Pauly and Lawton R. Burns, which is an extension of this research effort, addresses the link between life sciences discoveries and their dependence on the investor-driven market system. It looks at how the science actually played out through the interplay of personalities, the cultures within and between academic and corporate entities, and the significance of serendipity not as a mysterious phenomenon but one intrinsic to the successes and failures of the experimental approach. With newly aggregated data and case studies, the fundamental economic underpinnings of investor-driven discovery management are considered, not as an obstacle or deficiency, but as the only means by which scientists and managers can navigate the unknowable to discover new products.

== Awards ==
Rea has received the President's Medal from the Society for Experimental Biology, UK for pioneering investigations of primary proton pumps (1990), a Cozzarelli Prize from the National Academy of Sciences, USA for coauthorship of a paper of scientific excellence and originality (2010), and election as a Fellow of the American Association for the Advancement of Science for research discoveries on the membrane transport and detoxification of xenobiotics, and for distinguished accomplishments and creativity in science education (2013). His awards and honors in the educational sector include an Ira H. Abrams Memorial Award for Distinguished Teaching (the College of Arts and Sciences' highest teaching honor) (2009), a Christian R. and Mary F. Lindback Award for Distinguished Teaching (the university's highest teaching honor) (2014), the Department of Biology's Award for Excellence in Teaching (1996, 2005, 2013, 2019), and a Wharton Teaching Excellence Award (2019).

Rea was awarded an honorary Doctorate of Science (D.Sc.) by the University of Oxford, UK (2020) in recognition of his seminal biochemical research, and dedication and devotion to teaching, science-communication, and mentorship.

In 2025, Rea was awarded the Neal Award for excellence in scientific journalism.

== Publications ==
Rea is the author of over 130 papers and commentaries, and the author of two books, Fall (2004) and Managing Discovery: Harnessing Creativity to Drive Biomedical Innovation (2018).

Fall (2004), a photo-book for which Rea wrote the text, is a "hyper-macroscopic analysis of the color transformations characteristic of tree foliage in the Northeastern United States autumn...[featuring] vivid and brilliant images." This book was a joint project with Rea's former biochemistry mentee, Christopher Griffith, who is now a professional photographer.

Managing Discovery: Harnessing Creativity to Drive Biomedical Innovation (2018), coauthored with Mark V. Pauly and Lawton R. Burns, addresses the link between life sciences discoveries and their dependence on the investor-driven market system through in-depth considerations of the challenges that both scientists and managers must face in the pharmaceutical and medical device industries.

Other publications, a selection:

- Rea, P.A. (2024) Gliflozins for diabetes: from bark to bench to bedside. American Scientist, 112: 360–367
- Rea, P.A. (2023) Wie Glyphosat die Welt eroberte. Spektrum der Wissenschaft, 56–63.
- Rea, P.A. (2022) How glyphosate cropped up. American Scientist, 110: 170–177.
- Rea, P.A. (2020) Phytochelatin Synthase. In: Encyclopedia of Life Sciences (eLS). John Wiley & Sons, Ltd: Chichester, 1–15. DOI: 10.1002/9780470015902.a0028220.
- Rea, P.A. (2018) Plant Vacuoles. In: Encyclopedia of Life Sciences (eLS). John Wiley & Sons, Ltd: Chichester, 1–14. DOI: 10.1002/9780470015902.a0001675.pub3.
- Cahoon, R.E., Lutke, W.K., Cameron, J.C., Chen, S., Lee, S.G., Rivard, R.S., Rea, P.A., Jez, J.M. (2015) Adaptive engineering of phytochelatin-based heavy metal tolerance. J. Biol. Chem., 290: 17321–17330.
- Rea, P.A., Yin, P., Zahalka, R. (2015) Mit beigem Fett gegen Übergewicht? Spektrum der Wissenschaft, 26–32.
- Rea, P.A. (2012) Phytochelatin synthase: of a protease a peptide polymerase made. Physiol. Plant., 145: 154–164.
- Park, J., Song, W.-J., Mendoza-Cózat, D.G., Suter-Grotemeyer, M., Shim, D., Hörtensteiner, S., Geisler, M., Rea, P.A., Rentsch, D., Schroeder, J.I., Lee, Y., Martinoia, E. (2010) Arsenic tolerance in Arabidopsis is mediated by two ABCC-type phytochelatin transporters. Proc. Natl. Acad. Sci. USA, 107: 21187–21192.
- Rea, P.A. (2009) Talk about teaching and learning: The kick is in finding out stuff about stuff and sharing it with others. Almanac, 55: 8.
- Rea, P.A. (2009) Les statines: de la moisissure aux médicaments. Pour la science, N°379, Mai 2009.
