= Anthony J. Culyer =

British economist

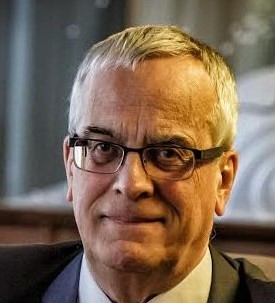
- Culyer in 2015
- Born: 1 July 1942 (age 84)
- Occupation: Economist

Anthony John (Tony) Culyer CBE (born 1 July 1942) is a British economist, and emeritus professor of economics at the University of York, visiting professor at Imperial College London and adjunct professor in health policy, evaluation and management at the University of Toronto, known for his work in the field of health economics.

== Biography ==
Culyer was educated at Sir William Borlase's Grammar School in Marlow, Buckinghamshire, and at King's School Worcester. He obtained his B.A. in economics at the University of Exeter in 1964. Sequentially he studied and worked another year at the University of California, Los Angeles, on a Fulbright Travel scholarship.

Culyer started his academic career at the University of Exeter in 1965 and subsequently moved to York in 1969, where he became professor at the Department of Economics & Related Studies. From 1986 to 2001 he was also department head, and from 1991 to 1997 pro-chancellor and then deputy vice-chancellor. At the University of Toronto he was appointed Ontario Chair of Health Policy & System Design. In Toronto from 2003 to 2006, on leave from York, he was also chief scientist at the Institute for Work and Health, of which he is still an adjunct professor, and chaired the Workplace Safety and Insurance Board's Research Council. In 2016, he was a distinguished visiting scholar, Witwatersrand University, South Africa and, since 2016, he has been a visiting professor at Imperial College London. He currently chairs the International Decision Support Initiative.

Culyer is a Fellow of the Royal Society of Arts, Honorary Fellow of the Royal College of Physicians, and Fellow of the Academy of Medical Sciences.

In 1999 Culyer was awarded Commander of the Most Excellent Order of the British Empire (CBE). In the same year, in 1999, he was awarded an honorary doctorate in economics by the Stockholm School of Economics. In 2015 he received the William B. Graham Prize for Health Services Research, along with Alan Maynard. In 2015 he also received the International Society for Pharmacoeconomics and Outcomes Research (ISPOR) Avedis Donabedian Outcomes Research Lifetime Achievement Award and was appointed Hall Laureate in Canada by the Justice Emmett Hall Memorial Foundation.

For many years he was organist and choir director at St Catherine's church, Barmby Moor, and until 2016 was a trustee and council member of the Royal School of Church Music.

== Work ==
=== Health economics ===
Culyer was the founding organizer of the Health Economists' Study Group in the UK in 1972, the first such professional organisation for health economists and since much copied around the world.

In 1982 he founded, together with Joe Newhouse at Harvard, the Journal of Health Economics, which quickly established itself as the principal international journal for health economics. He continued to edit it until 2013.

In 1994 Culyer chaired a task-force into Research and Development in the National Health Service of England and Wales which resulted in major changes in its organisation and funding. For many years Culyer was the chairman of the Office of Health Economics in London England.

In 1999 Culyer was appointed as the vice chair of the National Institute for Health Excellence (NICE) based in London, England, and led the economics side of its work until his move to Toronto in 2003. He later chaired NICE International's Advisory Group and its successor the International Decision Support Initiative based at Imperial College London, where he is a visiting professor.

=== Publications ===
He has written over 300 articles and short pieces and edited or authored 36 books, of which the most recent are The Encyclopedia of Health Economics (2014, Elsevier), The Dictionary of Health Economics (3rd edition, 2014, Edward Elgar) and (with colleagues) Portrait of a Health Economist: Festschrift in Honour of Bengt Jönsson, Lund: Institute of Health Economics, and (in 2016) A Star in the East: A Short History of HITAP, Bangkok: Amarin.

A collection of his essays was published in 2012 called The Humble Economist: Tony Culyer on Health, Health Care and Social Decision Making, (Eds. R A Cookson and K Claxton), London and York: Office of Health Economics and University of York.

== Selected publications ==
- Culyer, Anthony J. The Economics of Social Policy. Dunellen: New York, 1973.
- Culyer, Anthony J. The political economy of social policy. Oxford: Martin Robertson, 1980. ISBN 0855203706
- Culyer, Anthony J., and Joseph P. Newhouse, eds. Handbook of health economics. Elsevier, 2000. ISBN 0444822909
- Culyer, Anthony J. The Humble Economist: Tony Culyer on Health, Health Care and Social Decision Making, (Eds. R Cookson and K Claxton), London and York: Office of Health Economics and University of York, 2012. ISBN 0952560151
- Culyer, Anthony J. The Dictionary of Health Economics, 3rd edition, Cheltenham: Edward Elgar, 2014. ISBN 1781001995
- Culyer, Anthony J. (editor-in-chief), The Encyclopedia of Health Economics, Elsevier, 2014 (3 Vols) (online) ISBN 0123756790

Articles, a selection:

- Culyer, Anthony J. "The normative economics of health care finance and provision." Oxford review of economic policy (1989): 34–58.
- Culyer, Anthony J., and Adam Wagstaff. "Equity and equality in health and health care." Journal of health economics 12.4 (1993): 431–457.
- Rawlins, Michael D., and Anthony J. Culyer. "National Institute for Clinical Excellence and its value judgments." BMJ: British Medical Journal 329.7459 (2004): 224.
- McCabe, Christopher, Karl Claxton, and Anthony J. Culyer. "The NICE cost-effectiveness threshold." Pharmacoeconomics 26.9 (2008): 733–744.
- Culyer, Anthony J. "Cost-effectiveness thresholds in health care: a bookshelf guide to their meaning and use", Health Economics, Policy and Law, 11: (2016): 415–432.
