= Carolyn M. Clancy =

American public health officer

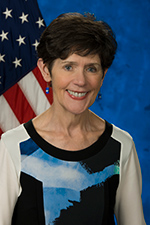
Carolyn M. Clancy, Veterans Affairs 2017

Carolyn Maureen Clancy is an American public health officer who served as director of the Agency for Healthcare Research and Quality (AHRQ) from 2003 to 2013. Since 2014 she has worked for the Veterans Health Administration in various positions, including chief medical officer (2015), executive in charge (2017–18), and acting deputy secretary (2021).

She was educated at Boston College and the UMass Chan Medical School and completed clinical training in internal medicine. Prior to joining AHRQ in 1990, she was an assistant professor of at the VCU School of Medicine in Virginia. She later became an associate professor at the George Washington University School of Medicine & Health Sciences. She was elected as a member of the National Academy of Medicine and a Master of the American College of Physicians in 2004, and received the William B. Graham Prize for Health Services Research in 2009. She is an honorary fellow of the American Academy of Nursing. She was recognized by the John Porter Legacy Award as one who upholds the stadards of leadership in medical research.
