= Robert G. Evans =

Canadian health economist

Robert G. Evans, OC, FRSC is a Canadian economist. As of 2026, he is Emeritus Professor at the Vancouver School of Economics at the University of British Columbia.

He was the recipient of the William B. Graham Prize for Health Services Research in 2001 and was appointed an Officer of the Order of Canada in 2004.
