= Doctor of Physical Therapy =

Professional doctoral degree

A Doctor of Physical Therapy or Doctor of Physiotherapy (DPT) degree is a qualifying degree in physical therapy. In the United States, it is considered a graduate-level first professional degree or doctoral degree for professional practice. In the United Kingdom, the training includes advanced professional training and doctoral-level research.

A Transitional Doctor of Physical Therapy degree is available in the US for those who already hold a professional Bachelor or Master of Physical Therapy (BPT or MPT) degree; as of 2015, all accredited and developing physical therapist programs in the US are DPT programs. Master's degrees in physical therapy are no longer offered in the US, and physical therapists beginning their education now study towards the Doctor of Physical Therapy degree.

== History ==
In 1992, the University of Southern California initiated the first post-professional "transitional" (DPT) program in the United States. This "transitional" DPT takes into account a physical therapist's current level of knowledge and skill and purports to offer programs that upgrade clinical skills to meet the needs of the current health care environment. Creighton University followed by initiating the first entry-level DPT program in 1993.

The Doctor of Physiotherapy has since been adopted in other countries such as the United Kingdom, Australia, and Taiwan. In the United Kingdom and Australia, the PhD or Professional Doctorate in Physiotherapy is offered by a number of universities. These programs are usually professional entry master's level programs, with the opportunity to undertake research to lead to a doctorate. Alternatively, these programs are master's pre-qualifying physiotherapy courses with an enhanced research element in the final phase of the course that leads to undertaking a doctorate. The first full pre-qualifying Doctorate in Physiotherapy program in the United Kingdom was accredited in 2017 at Glasgow Caledonian University in Glasgow.

== United States ==
The DPT degree prepares students to be eligible for the physical therapy license examination in all 50 US states. Along with the license examination, some states require physical therapists to take a law exam and a criminal background check. As of March 2017, there were 222 accredited Doctor of Physical Therapy programs in the United States. After completing a DPT program, the doctor of physical therapy may continue training in a residency and then fellowship. As of December 2013, there were 178 credentialed physical therapy residencies and 34 fellowships in the US, and 63 additional developing residencies and fellowships. Credentialed residencies are between 9 and 36 months while credentialed fellowships are between 6 and 36 months.

In 2000, the American Physical Therapy Association (APTA) passed its Vision 2020 statement, which states (in part):

By 2020, physical therapy will be provided by physical therapists who are doctors of physical therapy, recognized by consumers and other health care professionals as the practitioners of choice to whom consumers have direct access for the diagnosis of, interventions for, and prevention of impairments, functional limitations, and disabilities related to movement, function, and health.

As this statement highlights, the DPT program is an integral part of the APTA's continued advocacy for legislation granting consumers (i.e. patients and clients) direct access to physical therapists, rather than requiring physician referral. Direct access is said to decrease wait times for access to care and even help reduce both costs to consumers and overall healthcare costs. As of January 1, 2015, all 50 states and the District of Columbia allowed some form of direct access to physical therapists.

=== Time frame ===
Undergraduate	Doctor of Physical Therapy	Residency (optional)	Fellowship (optional)
4 years	3–4 years	1 to 3 years	1 to 5 years

The typical time frame for completion of a Doctor of Physical Therapy is 3 to 4 years after earning a bachelor's degree. Depending on residency and fellowship training, if undertaken, the doctor may have completed several years of additional training. Obtaining a DPT could also be done by accelerated programs offered by some universities that can be applied to by freshmen. These programs allow students to receive a bachelor's degree and DPT in 6 to 7 years. With these programs, there are various admission points over the course of their curriculum. Various programs allow students to apply directly out of high school and they will automatically matriculate into the professional phase of the program after completing the required undergraduate courses.

=== Admission ===
Admission to a Doctor of Physical Therapy program in the United States is highly competitive. According to the Aggregate Program Data Report from CAPTE from 2016 to 2017, the average grade point average for enrolling students was 3.6 out of 4 with a range of 3.20–3.88 for all programs. On average, there were 1,000 applicants per program with an average of 46 students enrolled. A bachelor's degree generally is required before beginning a Doctor of Physical Therapy program, but there is no requirement on the degree earned as long as all prerequisite course requirements are met. Obtaining a DPT could also be done by accelerated programs by some universities that can be applied by freshman. Through these programs students can receive a bachelor's degree and a DPT in 6 to 7 years. During the admission process into schools, one must fulfill the course prerequisites of the program. Students also must obtain physical therapy experience from clinics, with hours that might have to be verified by a physical therapist, depending on the school they are applying to. The Graduate Record Examination (GRE) is required for most programs, and must be taken and submitted to the school.

=== Transition Doctor of Physical Therapy degree ===
The t-DPT degree is conferred upon completion of a structured post-professional educational experience that results in the augmentation of knowledge, skills, and behaviors to a level consistent with the current professional (entry-level) DPT standards. The t-DPT degree enables the US-licensed physical therapist to attain degree parity with therapists who hold the professional DPT by filling in any gaps between their professional baccalaureate or master's degree PT education and the current professional DPT degree education.

The post-professional DPT (Transitional) degree is designed to provide the doctoral credential to those who currently holding a master's or bachelor's degree in the field. Post-professional DPT (Transitional) degree programs are typically offered on a primarily online learning model and are often one year in length.

=== Controversies ===
The use of the title doctor by physical therapists and other non-physician health care professionals has been debated. In a letter to The New York Times, the president of the American Physical Therapy Association responded:

To provide accurate information to consumers, the American Physical Therapy Association has taken a proactive approach and provides clear guidelines for physical therapists regarding the use of the title "Doctor." These guidelines state that physical therapists, in all clinical settings, who hold a Doctor of Physical Therapy degree (DPT) shall indicate they are physical therapists when using the title "Doctor" or "Dr," and shall use the titles in accord with jurisdictional law.

In 2007, the DPT degree was described as an example of "credential creep" or degree inflation in The Chronicle of Higher Education. Citing concerns that the DPT, and similar professional doctorates in areas such as occupational therapy, do not meet the standards of traditional doctoral degrees, the journal states: "The six-and-a-half-year doctor of physical therapy, or DPT, is rapidly replacing a six-year master's degree ... The American Physical Therapy Association ... has not set separate requirements for doctoral programs. To be accredited they need only to meet the same requirements as master's programs."

Critics in the 1990s questioned whether the rigor of the physical therapy curriculum and the scope of practice warranted the conferral of a professional degree similar to that characteristic of medicine, dentistry, or nursing. Proponents countered that the existing curricula are "victims of 'curricular inflation'." Rothstein and Moffat noted, the previous master's and even baccalaureate curricula rivaled those of most other professional doctorate programs, and these curricula often required more than the typical 72 credits mandated for a doctoral degree. The 2000 Fact Sheet from APTA reported that the mean number of credits required for the professional phase of the typical baccalaureate program was 83.0 credits and that the typical master's degree program required 95.5 credits. As of 2009 the typical number of prerequisite credits was 114.2 and the total number of professional credits was 116.5 for a total of 230.7 credit hours. Additional credit hours may also be earned in residency and fellowship. Threlkeld et al. suggested that the scope of existing physical therapy curricula already (in 1999) matched that of a professional doctorate, further submitting that students of a well-defined DPT program "will have earned the right to be recognized by the doctoral title".

=== Professional degree (entry-level) ===
As of 2012, the professional (entry-level) DPT degree was the degree conferred by all physical therapist professional programs upon successful completion of a three- to four-year post-baccalaureate degree program in the United States, preparing the graduate to enter the practice of physical therapy. Admission requirements for the program include completion of an undergraduate degree that includes specific prerequisite coursework, volunteer experience (or other exposure to the profession), and completion of a standardized graduate examination (e.g., GRE).

Typical prerequisite courses may include two semesters of anatomy and physiology with labs, two semesters of physics with labs, two semesters of chemistry with labs, a general course in psychology, another course in psychology, statistics, two semesters of biology, and may include other courses required by specific schools.

The physical therapist curriculum consists of foundational sciences (i.e., gross anatomy, cellular histology, embryology, neurology, neuroscience, kinesiology, physiology, exercise physiology, pathology, pharmacology, radiology/imaging, medical screening), behavioral sciences (communication, social and psychologic factors, ethics and values, law, business and management sciences, clinical reasoning and evidence-based practice), and clinical sciences (cardiovascular/pulmonary, endocrine and metabolic, gastrointestinal and genitourinary, integumentary, musculoskeletal, neuromuscular). Coursework also includes material specific to the practice of physical therapy (patient/client management model, prevention, wellness, and health promotion, practice management, management of care delivery, social responsibility, advocacy, and core values). Additionally, students have to engage in full-time clinical practice under the supervision of licensed physical therapists with an expectation of providing safe, competent, and effective physical therapy.

=== Continuing Education ===
Post-graduation, licensed physical therapists have the ability to pursue a clinical residency or fellowship to expand their knowledge and experience. Clinical residencies are designed to further a physical therapy resident's knowledge in a specific area of clinical practice. A clinical fellowship is a program for physical therapists in an area of the specific focus.

Physical therapists also have the ability to pursue specialty certifications, where they become board certified clinical specialists. Becoming a certified specialist allows the therapist to earn credentials that represents further dedication to patient care. It gives the opportunity for professional growth and positions in leadership and service. This specialization is done by building a broad foundation of professional education then building a skill set related to the particular specialization area. The certifications given in the specific areas are: cardiovascular and pulmonary, clinical electrophysiology, geriatrics, neurology, orthopedics, pediatrics, sports physical therapy, wound care, and women's health.

Physical therapists can provide various modalities of treatment for the patient. The modalities include: ultrasound, electrical stimulation, traction, joint mobilization, massage, heat, ice, kinesiology taping, and many more. Forms of treatment depends on the therapist's preference of treatment and the clinics equipment availability. Based on the patient, specific types of treatment might be better suited. Therapists might also find different modalities not as effective as others. However, some modalities might not be possible due to the clinics restrictions on space and equipment availability.

=== Advanced clinical science degree ===
The "advanced clinical science" doctorate (e.g., DPTSc or DScPT, DHSc, ScDPT) is one of several degrees conferred by academic institutions upon successful completion of a post-professional physical therapist education program. This program is intended to provide an experienced clinician with advanced knowledge, clinical skills, and professional behavior, usually in a specific specialty practice area. These programs typically culminate work that contributes new knowledge to clinical practice in the profession. Completion of these advanced clinical science doctoral programs may include credentialed clinical residencies and lead to ABPTS clinical specialization or other advanced certifications.

== United Kingdom ==
Some universities, such as Glasgow Caledonian University and Robert Gordon University, offer a 3.5 year DPT program, including both professional training and research, which leads to qualification as a physiotherapist eligible to register with the Health and Care Professions Council. In general, the qualifying degree for physiotherapy in the UK is a Bachelor or Master of Science in Physiotherapy. In 2013 the United Kingdom gave physiotherapists the power to prescribe medication.

== See also ==
- Physical therapy education
