= Cam Donaldson =

Scottish economist (born 1960)

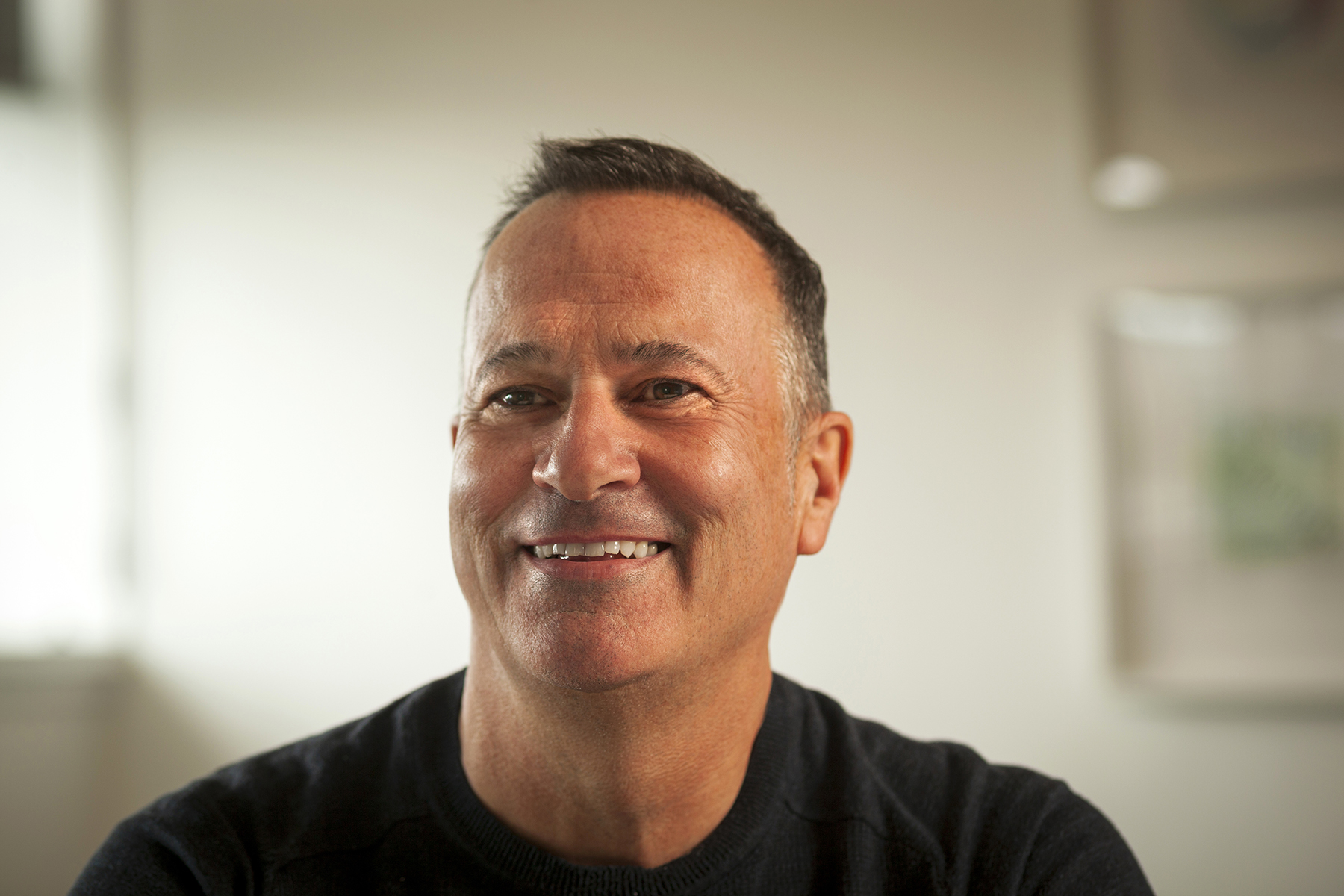
- Cam Donaldson (2022)
- Born: 30 November 1960 (age 65); Glasgow, Scotland
- Occupation: Health Economist

Cameron Richard Donaldson (born 30 November 1960) is a Scottish economist who is emeritus Yunus Chair at Glasgow Caledonian University, the University for the Common Good. From 2010 to 2023, Cam held the Yunus Chair at GCU, and, from 2016 to 2021, was Pro Vice Chancellor Research there, during which time Glasgow Caledonian became the first university to adopt the Sustainable Development Goals as the framework for its Research Strategy.

Donaldson's research is on measuring and valuing the benefits of health care, using economics in health care priority setting and economic evaluation. He has published over 300 refereed journal articles and eight books and has won over £30m in competitive funding awards, over £11m of this as principal investigator.

== Early life and education ==
Donaldson was born in Glasgow. His father was a trade union activist, working as a stereotyper at the Scottish Daily Express. His mother was a comptometer operator.

Having been educated at Bishopbriggs High School and Cheadle Moseley School for Boys, Donaldson went on to study economics at the University of Nottingham (1979–1982), immediately followed by a master's degree in Health Economics at the University of York (1982–83).

== Career ==
Donaldson worked as a research fellow during the first year of the Centre for Health Economics (CHE) at the University of York.

From York, Donaldson moved to the Health Care Research Unit at Newcastle University (1984–1988) and the Department of Public Health at the University of Sydney (1989–1990). He then returned to Scotland to spend most of the 1990s as deputy director of the Health Economics Research Unit at the University of Aberdeen (1991–98). Initially, he deputised to part-time Director, Gavin Mooney, one of the 'founding fathers' of health economics, who persuaded Donaldson to undertake a PhD under his supervision. He became a professor at Aberdeen in 1996 and, for five years of his tenure at Aberdeen, served as national organiser of the Health Economists' Study Group (HESG).

From 1998 to 2002, Donaldson held the Svare Chair in Health Economics at the University of Calgary. Whilst in Calgary he established the Health Economics Methods Group of the Cochrane Collaboration and acted as co-convenor from 1998 to 2008.

In 2001, the Health Foundation announced a national competition for a chair in Health Economics. Donaldson's colleagues at Newcastle invited him to be their candidate, and together they won the funding of £3m. At Newcastle, Donaldson became the inaugural director of the Institute of Health and Society (from 2006 to 2010). There he worked closely with Professor Michael Jones-Lee, Rachel Baker and Helen Mason in translating Jones-Lee's work on valuing human life and safety into the health arena, leading major projects for the Department of Health in England and the European Commission.

In 2010 he took up the Yunus Chair at Glasgow Caledonian University (GCU) where he established the Yunus Centre for Social Business and Health. From 2023 to 2026, Cam also held a part-time professorship in health economics at the Australian National University.

== Research ==
=== Using 'willingness to pay' to value the benefits of health care ===
Donaldson has pioneered this method in health, having developed novel approaches to quantifying values of patients and the public with respect to treatment options, demonstrating that: WTP can ‘detect’ values of attributes of care beyond health gain (i.e. ‘process utility’), and; distributional concerns (i.e. that WTP is associated with ability to pay) can be accommodated in applying the results of WTP studies to publicly funded health care settings. Cam also produced (with Jan Abel Olsen) the first-ever attempt to use WTP to establish relative priorities across health programmes, and has led major projects exploring the relationship between WTP and quality adjusted life years (QALYs).

=== Using economics in healthcare priority setting ===
Donaldson has led the development and use of an economic framework, known as programme budgeting and marginal analysis (PBMA), in local (geographically defined) health care settings where funders are charged with meeting the needs of local populations from limited funding envelopes. This has involved working directly with decision-makers in several contexts at various levels of health care systems in the UK, Canada and New Zealand, working largely with Craig Mitton at the University of British Columbia in Vancouver, using mainly qualitative research networks to document experiences. The main objective has been to adapt economics to complex management processes, so enhancing its uptake in decision-making and the framework has been used in several hundred health organisations globally. Related to this work, Donaldson acted as Honorary Secretary to the International Society on Priorities in Healthcare from 2006 to 2011, hosting the records and accounts of the society at Newcastle University.

=== Development and application of economic evaluation ===
Donaldson has acted as co-investigator on several economic evaluation projects over his career and has made important contributions to methods development in this area. Each has involved collaboration with health care researchers and professionals in several clinical settings. These evaluations have all created new knowledge in their respective clinical fields and have had various degrees of impact (e.g. feeding into NICE technology assessments), notably in nephrology, care of frail older people, osteoporosis screening, general surgery, sexual health and stroke. He has been a member of the National Institute for Health and Care Excellence Appraisal Committee and chaired the Family Planning Association's Expert Panel on the Economics of Sexual Health in England, which reported in August 2005. With respect to methods of economic evaluation, he has co-produced two important papers in health economics criticising the foundations of QALYs and demonstrating that, as with WTP, QALYs are influenced by socio-economic status.

=== Creating the first Centre for Social Business and Health ===
In 2013 Donaldson secured a programme grant worth £2 million over five years from the UK's Medical and Economic & Social Research Councils entitled 'Developing Methods for Evidencing Social Enterprise as a Public Health Intervention'. The project commenced in January 2014 and has since spawned several other large research grants from funders such as other UK Research Councils and the National Institute for Health Research.

== Awards ==
- Alberta Heritage Foundation for Medical Research, Senior Fellow (1998–2002);
- Canadian Institutes for Health Research Senior Investigator (2000–2002);
- Health Foundation Chair in Health Economics (2002–2010);
- Economic and Social Research Council, Advanced Institute for Management Research, Public Services Fellow (2003–2004)
- National Institute for Health and Care Research (NIHR), Inaugural Senior Investigator (2008–2012)
- Fellow of the Royal Society of Edinburgh (FRSE) (2022)

In 2024, Donaldson was listed by Research.com in the top 300 Economics and Finance Scientists (32 in the UK) all-time, by citation and publications. Cam is also listed in Stanford University's Top 2% Scientists' List.

== Personal life ==
Donaldson lives in Aberdeen with his wife and partner (since 1992), Diane, a successful university administrator.
