= Doctor of Physiotherapy =

The Doctor of Physiotherapy is a qualification providing training for physiotherapy in a few countries.

== Australia ==
The Doctor of Physiotherapy is an extended master's degree under the Australian Qualifications Framework Level 9 classification. The Doctor of Physiotherapy program at this time is only offered in Australia. The degree should not be confused with the American Doctor of Physical therapy, which is a post baccalaureate degree.

== Pakistan ==
The Doctor of Physiotherapy (DPT) is a five-year professional degree program in Pakistan that students take after finishing their higher secondary school, usually the F.Sc (Pre-Medical) or a comparable qualification like A-Levels with biology. The Higher Education Commission (HEC) of Pakistan validates DPT as equivalent to 17 years of education.

The curriculum comprises lessons on basic medical sciences, clinical physiotherapy, rehabilitation techniques, and research procedures. The goal of the curriculum is to get graduates ready to evaluate, diagnose, and treat a wide range of physical, musculoskeletal, and neuromuscular problems.

After they finish their degree, graduates can apply for a license from the Pakistan Physical Therapy Council (PPTC). This allows them to work as entry-level physiotherapists. They can work in hospitals, private clinics, rehabilitation centers, sports groups, and schools as a professional.

=== Physiotherapy institutes in Lahore ===
Institute	Location
FMH Institute of Allied Health Sciences (FMHCMD)	Zahoor Ellahi Road Gulberg Lahore
NUR International University	Raiwind Road Lahore
University of Health Sciences	Mall Road
King Edward Medical University – School of Physiotherapy	Nelagumbad, Anarkali, Lahore
Allama Iqbal College of Physiotherapy (AIMC)	Allama Shabbir Ahmed Usmani Rd / Canal Rd area
CMH Lahore Medical College – School of Allied Health Sciences	Abdur Rehman Road, Lahore Cantt.
Riphah International University – Gulberg Campus	26-M, Gulberg-III, Ferozepur Road
