= William B. Graham Prize for Health Services Research =

The William B. Graham Prize for Health Services Research is an award acknowledging contributions to health care research. It is funded by the Baxter International Foundation, and awarded every year through the US-based Association of University Programs in Health Administration (AUPHA). The recipient is awarded $25,000, with another $25,000 given to a non-profit institution selected by him or her.

Until 2005, the prize was named The Baxter International Foundation Prize for Health Services Research. It was renamed in 2006, after the death of long-time CEO of Baxter International, William B. Graham.

== List of recipients ==
=== The Baxter International Foundation Prize ===
- 1986: Avedis Donabedian
- 1987: Brian Abel-Smith
- 1988: Joseph Newhouse and Robert H. Brook
- 1989: M. Eisenberg
- 1990: Rosemary A. Stevens
- 1991: Victor Fuchs
- 1992: John D. Thompson and Robert B. Fetter
- 1993: John Wennberg
- 1994: Alain Enthoven
- 1995: Stephen M. Shortell
- 1996: Kerr L. White
- 1997: David Mechanic
- 1998: Harold S. Luft
- 1999: Ronald Andersen and Odin W. Anderson
- 2000: Karen Davis
- 2001: Robert G. Evans
- 2002: John M. Eisenberg (awarded posthumously)
- 2003: (unknown)
- 2004: Barbara Starfield
- 2005: David Sackett

=== William B. Graham Prize ===
- 2006: Linda Aiken
- 2007: Donald Berwick
- 2008: Michael Marmot
- 2009: Carolyn Clancy
- 2010: Uwe Reinhardt
- 2011: Edward H. Wagner
- 2012: Mark V. Pauly
- 2013: Dorothy P. Rice
- 2014: Stuart Altman
- 2015: Anthony Culyer and Alan Maynard
- 2016: John K. Iglehart
- 2017: David Blumenthal

== See also ==
- List of medicine awards
