= Alan Maynard =

British health economist (1944-2018)

Alan Keith Maynard OBE FMedSci (15 December 1944 – 2 February 2018) was a British health economist.

== Biography ==
Born in Bebington, Maynard studied at the Universities of Newcastle upon Tyne and York. After a stint at the University of Exeter, he was appointed to the University of York in 1971. There, he became a professor in 1983, founded the Centre for Health Economics (CHE) the same year.

In 1986, Maynard suggested the use of a cost-effectiveness hurdle for new pharmaceutical products and drug budgets for controlling the growth in public expenditure on medicines. This latter led to the introduction of the GP Fundholding scheme in 1991.

Maynard created the York Health Policy Group in 1996. In 1995, he briefly served as the Chief Executive of the Nuffield Provincial Hospitals Trust. From 1997 to 2010, Maynard was Chairman of the York Hospitals NHS Foundation Trust. He was founding editor of the journal Health Economics and commentator for Pulse.

In 2000, Maynard was made Fellow of the Academy of Medical Sciences. He was made an Officer of the Order of the British Empire in 2009 for his involvement in the National Health Service and also received honorary degrees from the University of Aberdeen in 2003 and the University of Northumbria in 2006. Along with his long-time colleague Anthony J. Culyer, he was the recipient of the 2015 William B. Graham Prize for Health Services Research.
