= Doctor of Health Science =

Post-professional doctoral degree

The Doctor of Health Science (DHSc or DHS) is a post-professional academic doctoral degree for those who intend to pursue or advance a professional practice career in Health Sciences and Health Care Delivery Systems, which can include clinical practice, education, administration, and research. Master's credentials are a requirement for DHSc programs. Individuals who complete the DHSc face the particular challenge of understanding and adapting scientific knowledge in order to achieve health gain and results. This degree leads to a career in high-level administration, teaching, applied research, or practice, where advanced analytical and conceptual capabilities are required. The Doctor of Health Science is a degree that prepares scholarly professionals in healthcare and leadership roles. The first Doctor of Health Science degree was offered in 2000 by the University of St. Augustine for Health Sciences.

== Background ==
In Europe and Australia, the degree is awarded after completion of two to three years of coursework and research beyond the master's degree. Similarly, in the United States, an individual typically has to complete three to four years of study beyond the master's degree. In order to be accepted into the program, a person must possess a master's degree from a regionally accredited American university, and have prior health care experience. In addition to completing two to four years of intensive course work, candidates must typically complete an applied research project or dissertation.

== Comparison ==
A majority of DHSc programs have been compared in course content to the Doctor of Public Health (DrPH), Doctor of Health Administration (DHA), Doctor of Science (ScD), and the Doctor of Philosophy in Health Science (PhD) degrees, but often distinguishes itself from these degrees in focus and scholarship requirements. Furthermore, Master's credential health professionals (e.g., Occupational Therapist, Physical Therapist, Recreational Therapy, Physician Associate, Pathologists' assistant, Public Health, Radiographer, Respiratory Therapist, Speech and language therapist, [behavior analyst]Health Education Specialist (CHES/MCHES), advanced practice clinicians/diagnosticians with master's degrees, as well as mid- and executive-level healthcare administrators and educators, and public health professionals) are drawn to the DHSc credential in an effort to advance their careers toward top executive echelons and academic appointments.

== Programs of study ==
=== United States ===
==== Regionally accredited ====
- A.T. Still University
- Bay Path University
- California University of Pennsylvania
- Campbell University
- Drexel University
- East Stroudsburg University
- Eastern Virginia Medical School
- George Washington University
- Indiana State University
- Keiser University
- Massachusetts College of Pharmacy and Health Sciences
- Mass General Brigham University of Health Professions
- Nova Southeastern University
- Pacific University
- Purdue University Global
- Radford University
- Thomas Jefferson University
- Touro University Worldwide
- University of Indianapolis
- University of Bridgeport
- University of New Haven
- University of North Texas
- University of the Pacific

==== Regionally accredited: former programs ====
- Loma Linda University
- Midwestern University
- University of St. Augustine

=== Europe ===
- University of Nottingham
- De Montfort University
- Staffordshire University
- University of Portsmouth
- University of Worcester
- University of Bath

=== Australia ===
- Queensland University of Technology
- Charles Sturt University
- University of Tasmania

=== Hong Kong ===
- Hong Kong Polytechnic University

=== New Zealand ===
- Auckland University of Technology

== See also ==
- Doctor of Public Health
- Doctor of Health Administration
- Doctor of Nursing Practice
- Doctor of Physical Therapy
