= Mass General Brigham University of Health Professions =

Private university in Boston, Massachusetts, US

- Type: Private university
- Established: 1977
- Affiliations: Mass General Brigham Massachusetts General Hospital
- Endowment: US $56.7 million (as of September 2024)
- President: Deborah Jones
- Faculty: 130
- Students: 1,894
- Location: Boston, Massachusetts, United States; 42.374994°N 71.05392271°W
- Campus: Urban
- Website: mgbu.edu

Mass General Brigham University of Health Professions (formerly MGH Institute of Health Professions or MGH IHP) is a private university focused on the health sciences and located in Boston, Massachusetts. It was founded by Massachusetts General Hospital in 1977 and is accredited by the New England Commission of Higher Education.

== History ==
From 1873 until 1981, Massachusetts General Hospital operated the Massachusetts General Hospital School of Nursing, granting diplomas in nursing only. In 1977, the Commonwealth of Massachusetts authorized the hospital system to grant academic degrees, and that same year the Massachusetts General Hospital Academic Division was launched.

The school was renamed MGH Institute of Health Professions in 1980, admitting its first cohort of students. The first degree granted was a Master of Science in Physical Therapy with the first class graduating in 1983. The school began admitting its first entry-level Master of Nursing Science students in 1982. In 1985, MGH Institute of Health Professions was re-constituted as a separate corporation from Massachusetts General Hospital, and in 2001 it moved into the Charlestown Navy Yard in Boston.

On September 1, 2026, the institution was renamed Mass General Brigham University to reflect its new undergraduate programs and affiliation with the Mass General Brigham health care system.

Today, Mass General Brigham University of Health Professions offers 35 degree programs and has an alumni base of over 12,000 worldwide.

== Academics ==
Mass General Brigham University of Health Professions offers two undergraduate degrees, an accelerated Bachelor of Science in Nursing and a Bachelor of Science in Health Sciences. The rest of its academic programs focus on the graduate level; entry-level programs like a Doctor of Occupational Therapy, Doctor of Physical Therapy, Master of Science in Speech-Language Pathology, Master of Science in Nursing, and Master of Physician Assistant Studies; and post-professional programs like a PhD in Rehabilitation Sciences, Doctor of Speech Language Pathology, Doctor of Nursing Practice, and Master of Science in Health Professions Education. Established in 2013, the university's entry-level Doctor of Occupational Therapy program was the first of its kind in New England. Other programs include graduate certificate offerings, several non-degree course options, and Certificates of Advanced Study in the health professions.

The university and its programs are all accredited by their corresponding accreditation bodies, including the New England Association of Schools and Colleges, the Massachusetts Board of Registration in Nursing, the Commission on Collegiate Nursing Education, the Council on Academic Accreditation of the American Speech-Language-Hearing Association, the Commission on Accreditation in Physical Therapy Education, and the Massachusetts Department of Elementary and Secondary Education.

== Student demographics ==
Demographics of the Mass General Brigham University student body (2024)
African American	7%
American Indian or Alaskan Native	<1%
Asian American	13%
White, non-Hispanic	58%
Hispanic American	10%
Other/Unknown	11%

In 2025, the university's student body was 86 percent female. Over 94 percent matriculated through to the end of their degree program.

== Facilities ==
The university has over 168,000 square feet of classroom and laboratory space at its campus, including space for pro-bono rehabilitation centers, simulation labs and general faculty and student research.

== Notable alumni ==
- Eunice D. Kinney (1881), physician
