= Karen Davis (economist) =

American economist (born 1942)

- Occupations: President, The Commonwealth Fund

Karen Davis (born 1942) is a former president of The Commonwealth Fund, a national philanthropy engaged in independent research on health and social policy issues. Davis is an economist, with a career in public policy and research. Before joining The Commonwealth Fund, she served as chairman of the Department of Health Policy and Management at The Johns Hopkins School of Public Health, where she also held an appointment as professor of economics. She served as deputy assistant secretary for health policy in the Department of Health and Human Services from 1977 to 1980, becoming the first woman to head a U.S. public health service agency.

Prior to her government career, Davis was a senior fellow at the Brookings Institution in Washington, D.C., a visiting lecturer at Harvard University, and an assistant professor of economics at Rice University. A native of Oklahoma, she received her Ph.D. in economics from Rice University

She serves on the board of directors of the Geisinger Health System. Davis was elected to the Institute of Medicine in 1975, has served two terms on the IOM governing council (1986–1990 and 1997–2000), and was a member of the IOM Committee on Redesigning Health Insurance Benefits, Payment and Performance Improvement Programs and the IOM Committee on Rapid Advance Demonstration Projects: Health Care Finance and Delivery Systems. She is a past president of the AcademyHealth (formerly AHSRHP) and an AcademyHealth distinguished fellow. She is a member of the Kaiser Commission on Medicaid and the Uninsured and is an elected Fellow of the American Academy of Arts and Sciences. Davis is a former member of the Agency for Healthcare Quality and Research (AHRQ) National Advisory Committee and the Panel of Health Advisors for the Congressional Budget Office. Davis is also one of the best female backgammon players in the world, has served on the United States Backgammon Federation board of directors and was elected to the USBGF Hall of Fame in 2020.

== Awards (selected) ==
- Distinguished Alumna Award, Rice University, 1991
- Baxter-Allegiance Foundation Prize for Health Services Research, 2000
- Honorary Doctorate of Humane Letters, Johns Hopkins University, 2001
- Distinguished Investigator Award, AcademyHealth, 2006
- Institute of Medicine's Adam Yarmolinsky Medal, 2011
- Picker Award for Excellence in the Advancement of Patient Centered Care, 2006
- Honorary Fellow, Royal College of Physicians, 2011
- Honorary Fellow, American College of Healthcare Executives, 2012
- 2012 Distinguished Service Award, American Hospital Association
- 2013 Health Research & Educational Trust (HRET) TRUST Award, American Hospital Association

== Books ==
- With Gerard F. Anderson, Diana Rowland, and Earl P. Steinberg: Health Care Cost Containment, The Johns Hopkins University Press, Baltimore, MD, 1990.
- With Diane Rowland: Medicare Policy: New Directions for Health and Long-Term Care, The Johns Hopkins University Press, Baltimore, MD, 1986.
- With Cathy Schoen: Health and the War on Poverty: A Ten Year Appraisal, The Brookings Institution, Washington, DC, 1978.
- National Health Insurance: Benefits, Costs, and Consequences, The Brookings Institution, Washington, DC, 1975.
- With Richard Foster: Community Hospitals: Inflation in the Pre-Medicare Period, Social Security Administration, Washington, DC, 1972.
- Net Income of Hospitals, 1961–1969, Social Security Administration, Washington, DC, 1970.

== Selected journal articles and congressional testimony ==
- S. Guterman, K. Davis, K. Stremikis, and H. Drake, "Innovation in Medicare and Medicaid Will Be Central to Health Reform's Success," Health Affairs, June 2010 29(6):1188–93., http://content.healthaffairs.org/content/29/6/1188.abstract?sid=6a3df8a4-b35f-47da-b4bb-b550b06ad3ec
- C. Schoen, K. Davis, and S. R. Collins, "Building Blocks for Reform: Achieving Universal Coverage with Private and Public Group Health Insurance," Health Affairs, May/June 2008 27(3):646–57, http://content.healthaffairs.org/content/27/3/646.abstract?sid=77092dee-668d-45ac-bb44-1ebf44e23292
- K. Davis, Toward a High Performance Health System: New Commonwealth Fund Commission, Health Affairs, September/October 2005, 24 (5): 1356–60, http://content.healthaffairs.org/content/24/5/1356.abstract?sid=b51a2ac0-9532-4c8e-a8a7-d6622d67bbee
- K. Davis and A. T. Huang, Learning From Taiwan: Experience with Universal Health Insurance, Annals of Internal Medicine, Feb. 19, 2008 148(4):313–14, http://www.commonwealthfund.org/usr_doc/1103_Davis_learning_from_Taiwan.pdf?section=4039%5B%5D
- K. Davis, Changing Course: Trends in Health Insurance Coverage, 2000–2008, Hearing on "Income, Poverty, and Health Insurance Coverage: Assessing Key Consensus Indicators of Family Well-Being in 2008," Joint Economic Committee, U.S. House of Representatives, September 10, 2009, http://www.commonwealthfund.org/Publications/Testimonies/2009/Sep/Changing-Course-Trends-in-Health-Insurance-Coverage-2000-2008.aspx%5B%5D
- E. S. Fisher, D. M. Berwick, K. Davis, “Achieving Health Care Reform — How Physicians Can Help,” New England Journal of Medicine, published online May 20, 2009, http://www.nejm.org/doi/full/10.1056/NEJMp0903923
- K. Davis, "Slowing the Growth of Health Care Costs — Learning from International Experience," New England Journal of Medicine, Oct. 23, 2008 359(17):1751–55, http://www.nejm.org/doi/full/10.1056/NEJMp0805261
- K. Davis and C. Schoen, Using What Works: Medicare, Medicaid, and the State Children's Health Insurance Program as a Base for Health Care Reform, Invited Testimony, House Committee on Energy and Commerce, Subcommittee on Health Hearing on "America's Need for Health Reform," September 18, 2008, http://www.commonwealthfund.org/Publications/Testimonies/2008/Sep/Testimony--Using-What-Works--Medicare--Medicaid--and-the-State-Childrens-Health-Insurance-Program-as.aspx%5B%5D
