= Mark V. Pauly =

American economist

Academic background
- Education: University of Virginia (PhD 1967); University of Delaware (MA 1965); Xavier University (AB 1963)

Academic work
- Institutions: The Wharton School of the University of Pennsylvania (1983–present); Northwestern University; University of Virginia
- Notable ideas: Individual Mandate; Economics of Moral Hazard
- Awards: 2012 Victor R. Fuchs Lifetime Achievement Award from ASHEcon; 2012 President of the American Society of Health Economics; 2012 William B. Graham Prize for Health Services Research from the Baxter International Foundation and the Association of University Programs in Health Administration

Mark V. Pauly is an American economist whose work focuses on healthcare management and business economics. He is currently the Bendheim Professor in the Department of Health Care Management at the Wharton School of the University of Pennsylvania. Pauly is a former commissioner on the Physician Payment Review Commission, and has been a consultant to the Congressional Budget Office, the Office of the Secretary of the U.S. Department of Health and Human Services, the American Enterprise Institute, and served on the Medicare Technical Advisory Panel. He is also the Co-Editor-in-Chief of the Springer journal International Journal of Health Care Finance and Economics, and was formerly the Robert D. Eilers Professor from 1984 to 1989.

== Career ==
Pauly received his AB from Xavier University in 1963, his MA from the University of Delaware in 1965, and a PhD in economics from the University of Virginia in 1967.

Pauly is a co-editor-in-chief of the International Journal of Health Care Finance and Economics and an associate editor of the Journal of Risk and Uncertainty. He has served on Institute of Medicine panels on public accountability for health insurers under Medicare and on improving the financing of vaccines. Pauly is a former member of the advisory committee to the Agency for Health Care Research and Quality, and most recently a member of the Medicare Technical Advisory Panel.

Pauly is a former commissioner of the Physician Payment Review Commission and an active member of the Institute of Medicine. He is Professor of Health Care Systems, Insurance and Risk Management, and Business and Public Policy at the Wharton School and Professor of Economics in the School of Arts and Sciences at the University of Pennsylvania. In 2005, he and Philip A. Rea co-founded the Roy and Diana Vagelos Program in Life Sciences and Management and continues to serve as Emeritus Faculty Co-Director.

== Contributions ==
One of the nation's leading health economists, Pauly has made significant contributions to the fields of medical economics and health insurance. He is considered to be one of the key architects of the individual mandate, which he and a team of economists proposed to George H. W. Bush in the late 1980s. His classic study on the economics of moral hazard was the first to point out how health insurance coverage may affect patients' use of medical services. Subsequent work, both theoretical and empirical, has explored the impact of conventional insurance coverage on preventive care, outpatient care, and prescription drug use in managed care.

In addition, he has explored the influences that determine whether insurance coverage is available and, by several cost-effectiveness studies, the influence of medical care and health practices on health outcomes and cost. His interests in health policy deal with ways to reduce the number of uninsured through tax credits for public and private insurance and the appropriate design for Medicare in a budget-constrained environment.

He is currently studying the effect of poor health on worker productivity.

== Awards and honors ==
- Victor R. Fuchs Lifetime Achievement Award from ASHEcon, 2012
- President of the American Society of Health Economics, 2012
- William B. Graham Prize for Health Services Research from the Baxter International Foundation and the Association of University Programs in Health Administration, 2012
- University of Pennsylvania Provost's Award for Distinguished Ph.D. Teaching and Mentoring, 2011–2012
- John M. Eisenberg Excellence in Mentorship Award from the Agency for Health Care Research and Quality, 2007
- Distinguished Investigator Award from AcademyHealth, 2007
- National Institute of Health Care Management Foundation's Research Award (with M. Kate Bundorf) for “Is Health Insurance Affordable for the Uninsured?” (Journal of Health Economics 2006), 2007
- Spencer Kimball Article Award (with Howard Kunreuther) from the Journal of Insurance Regulation for, 2006

== Selected publications ==
- 2018: Managing Discovery: Harnessing Creativity to Drive Biomedical Innovation, coauthored with Philip A. Rea and Lawton R. Burns.
- 2013: Health Reform without Side Effects: Making Markets Work for Individual Health Insurance. Hoover Press. 2013-09-01. ISBN 978-0-8179-1046-4.
- 2006: "Is Health Insurance Affordable for the Uninsured?" (Journal of Health Economics, July 2006) co-authored with M. Kate Bundorf.doi:10.1016/j.jhealeco.2005.11.003
