= Institute for Work and Health =

Canadian not-for-profit organization

Institute for Work & Health (IWH)
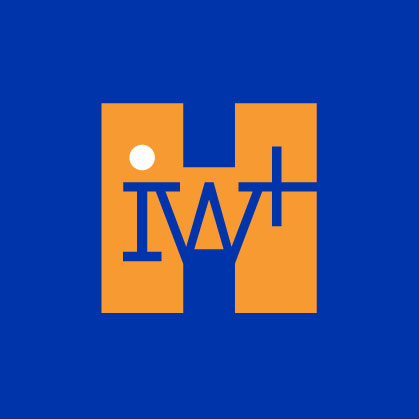
- Logo of the Institute for Work & Health, an independent, not-for-profit research organization based in Toronto, Canada
- Formation: 1990
- Purpose: Independent, not-for-profit occupational health and safety research
- Location: Toronto, Ontario
- Website: www.iwh.on.ca
- Formerly called: Ontario Workers’ Compensation Institute (OWCI)

The Institute for Work & Health (IWH) is an independent, not-for-profit research organization based in Toronto, Canada. Its mission is to “conduct and mobilize research that supports policy-makers, employers and workers in creating healthy, safe and inclusive work environments”

== Operations ==
Since 2013, IWH has operated with core funding from the Government of Ontario through the Ministry of Labour (Ontario). For the 22 years previous to that, since its founding in 1990, the core funder was Ontario's Workplace Safety and Insurance Board and its predecessors. The institute maintains an arm's-length relationship with its core funder. Institute scientists also apply for and receive grants from peer-reviewed funding agencies in Canada, such as the Canadian Institutes of Health Research and the Social Sciences and Humanities Research Council. IWH's board of directors includes senior business, labour and academic representatives. A scientific advisory committee provides guidance on IWH research activities. IWH has formal affiliations with four universities in Ontario, Canada: University of Toronto, University of Waterloo, McMaster University and York University. The institute has access to data sources from the Workplace Safety and Insurance Board and Statistics Canada. IWH is part of the health and safety system in Ontario.

== Research ==
IWH research falls into two broad areas:

- the prevention of work-related injury and illness (primary prevention), which includes studies of programs, policies and practices, and the health of workers in the population at large; and
- the health and recovery of injured workers (secondary prevention), which involves research on treatment, return to work, disability prevention and management, and compensation policy.

IWH research focuses on these topics:

- work-related musculoskeletal disorders
- occupational health and safety practices
- vulnerable workers (such as newcomers, young workers, temporary workers)
- regulations and incentives
- working conditions and health
- return-to-work practices
- clinical treatment
- compensation and benefits
- measurement of health and function
- accessibility of work places to people with disabilities

IWH also conducts systematic reviews of occupational health and safety research. Systematic reviews provide an overview of the evidence from higher quality studies on a specific research question. Cochrane Back and Neck (formerly known as the Cochrane Back Review Group) is based at IWH and conducts systematic reviews of clinical research on back and neck pain.

In 2020, in the context of the COVID-19 pandemic, the institute published research on the impact of unsafe workplaces on worker's mental health.

== Publications, tools and guides ==
Each week, IWH offers research alerts, a compiled list of new and emerging academic literature in the areas of occupational health and safety, epidemiology, public health, and related areas.

IWH also hosts a monthly public online speaker series.

IWH has produced a number of tools and guides based on its research evidence, including:

- A Guide to Successful Participatory Ergonomics Programs
- Breakthrough Change Case Study Series
- Disabilities of the Arm, Shoulder and Hand (DASH) Outcome Measure
- eOfficeErgo: Ergonomics e-Learning for Office Workers
- IWH Organizational Performance Metric
- OHS Vulnerability Measure
- Opioid Manager
- Red Flags/Green Lights: A Guide to Identifying and Solving Return-to-Work Problems
- Seven Principles for Successful Return to Work
- So Your Back Hurts …
- Prevention is the Best Medicine: A Tool Kit for Teaching Newcomers

IWH also produces regular newsletters, including

- IWH News, a monthly e-newsletter
- At Work, a quarterly newsletter
- Sharing Best Evidence, a periodic newsletter summarizing the results of a systematic review conducted by the institute
- Issue Briefing, a periodic newsletter on the policy implications of health, safety, disability and/or workers’ compensation research
