= Jack Wiseman (economist) =

British economist

- Born: December 1919
- Died: 1991
- Occupation: Economist

Jack Wiseman (1919 in Brierfield, Lancashire – 1991) was a British economist. At York, Wiseman helped the government develop links with academic departments.

He joined the Territorial Army in 1939 and fought in the Second World War. Wiseman joined the London School of Economics as a student in 1946, where he later became a lecturer in business and public finance. In 1964, Wiseman joined the University of York, where he was founding director of the Institute of Social and Economic Research.

== Selected publications ==
- The Growth of Public Expenditure in the United Kingdom. (with Alan T. Peacock) George Allen & Unwin, 1961
- Cost, Choice and Political Economy. Edward Elgar Publishing Ltd, 1989
