= Lawton Burns =

American business theorist

Lawton Robert Burns

Academic background
- Education: University of Chicago (Ph.D., 1981), MBA, 1984)
- Influences: James Samuel Coleman, Charles Bidwell, Edward Laumann

Academic work
- Discipline: Healthcare management Management science Sociology
- Institutions: The Wharton School (1994-present); University of Arizona (1985–1994)
- Notable ideas: Work on hospital-physician relationships, physician networks, and strategic change

Lawton R. Burns (born 1951) is an American business theorist, serving as the James Joo-Jin Kim Professor, professor of Health Care Management, and professor of Management at The Wharton School of The University of Pennsylvania.

== Career ==
Burns received a BA in sociology and anthropology in 1971 from Haverford College. Following this, he received his MA in sociology in 1976, his PhD in sociology in 1981 and his MBA in Health Administration in 1984, all three from the University of Chicago.

Burns started his academic career at the Graduate School of Business of the University of Chicago, and moved to the College of Business Administration of the University of Arizona. From 1998 to 2002, he was a visiting scholar in the Department of Preventive Medicine at the University of Wisconsin School of Medicine and Public Health. He previously served as the chair of the Health Care Management department.

In 1999, he received an Investigator Award in Health Research Policy from the Robert Wood Johnson Foundation.

In 2013, Burns joined the Roy and Diana Vagelos Program in Life Sciences and Management as a faculty co-director. Outside of his duties as professor, he performs consulting and speaking engagements.

== Notable contributions ==
Burns is known for having analyzed the bankruptcy of the Allegheny Health Education & Research Foundation, which owned the first medical school ever to go bankrupt. He has testified to the Federal Trade Commission about clinical integration and served as an expert witness for the Federal Trade Commission in its case against Evanston Northwestern Healthcare Medical Group.

Burns has analyzed physician-organization integration over the past twenty-five years. The last 13 years he spent studying the healthcare supply chain. He completed a book on supply chain management in the healthcare industry, The Health Care Value Chain (Jossey-Bass, 2002), and a recent analysis of alliances between imaging equipment makers and hospital systems. These studies focus on the strategic alliances and partnerships developing between pharmaceutical firms/distributors, disposable manufacturers, medical device manufacturers, group purchasing organizations, and organized delivery systems. He has also edited The Business of Healthcare Innovation (Cambridge University Press, 2012) which analyzes the healthcare technology sectors globally: pharmaceuticals, biotechnology, medical devices, and information technology. He has served as lead editor of the 6th Edition of the major text, Healthcare Management: Organization Design & Behavior (Delmar, 2011). India’s Healthcare Industry, was published in 2014 (Cambridge University Press, 2014).

== Publications ==
Publications, a selection:

- 2021 The U.S. Healthcare Ecosystem: Payers, Providers, Producers
- 2018. Managing Discovery: Harnessing Creativity to Drive Biomedical Innovation, coauthored with Philip A. Rea and Mark V. Pauly
- 2017: China's Healthcare System and Reform, co-edited with Gordon G. Liu
- 2014: India's Healthcare Industry: Innovation in Delivery, Financing, and Manufacturing
- 2012: The Business of Healthcare Innovation, 2nd Edition
- 2002. The Health Care Value Chain: Producers, Purchasers, and Providers
- 2005. The Business of Healthcare Innovation
- 2006. History & Health Policy in the United States
