= Doctor of Health Administration =

The Doctor of Health Administration (D.H.A.) is a doctoral degree focused with the development of theoretical knowledge in health administration and on the applied application of the said knowledge in the field of health administration. The D.H.A. requires significant coursework beyond the master's level and often requires a dissertation or capstone project that contributes to knowledge or practice.

== Description ==
The Doctor of Health Administration is a research degree. The research can be theoretical or applied. According to the United States Department of Education, research doctoral degrees such as the Doctor of Health Administration and the Doctor of Business Administration are equivalent to the PhD The PhD is just one of the many degree titles associated with research doctoral degrees. A difference between the DHA and PhD is that the DHA's dissertation allows for a theoretical or applied approach rather than a strictly theoretical approach.

== History ==
The Doctor of Health Administration was first introduced in the U.S. in the late 1990s at the Medical University of South Carolina as an advanced professional doctorate in health leadership. This doctoral degree focuses on advanced professional knowledge and applied research in health administration, policy, and leadership. New programs have been instituted at other universities providing substantial amounts of online coursework. Most D.H.A. students are working health professionals who seek doctoral education. Admission to the three year degree typically requires two years of coursework beyond the master's degree (i.e. M.H.A., M.P.A., M.S.A., or M.P.H.) and an applied or theoretical dissertation to be completed in the third year.

== Program structure ==
Most D.H.A. programs require about 70 credit hours beyond the master's degree. Students are expected to take a number of core classes, electives, research/method classes, and dissertation credits. Candidates typically work with a committee and advisors throughout the process and the dissertation eventually requires an oral defense to the student's committee. Curricula may be offered on a full-time or part-time basis. The normal duration of a doctorate should correspond to 3–5 years of full-time graduate study or 7–10 years of sustained part-time graduate study.

== Purpose ==
The Doctor of Health Administration program prepares health professionals to become innovative leaders and problem solvers within the healthcare industry. By blending the theoretical with the practical, the coursework of this advanced doctorate of health administration degree program provides students with the holistic knowledge needed to transition into careers that improve and influence healthcare administration systems.

== See also ==
- Doctor of Public Administration
- Doctor of Public Health
- Doctor of Health Science
- Upsilon Phi Delta
