= Practitioner-teacher model =

The practitioner-teacher model involves the incorporation of practice, teaching, consultation and research responsibilities in the delivery of education. The model is most closely associated with Rush University, a health sciences university developed within Rush-Presbyterian-St.-Luke's Medical Center in Chicago, Illinois. This unique structure was dubbed the 'practitioner teacher model,' in that all aspects of the university were operated by the full-time practitioners - clinicians and administrators - who ran the medical center.

== Features ==
Several features differentiate practitioner-teacher model programs from more traditional, academically-based universities:

- Programs are housed within applied settings, with coursework delivered by practitioners experienced in applying the concepts to real-world challenges.
- All aspects of coursework focus heavily on applied practice, at a level that is beyond what non-practicing faculty can achieve.
- Admissions criteria emphasize profession-relevant characteristics of applicants, in addition to academic credentials.

Graduates of practitioner-teacher programs are also more likely to enter into applied and/or clinical settings upon graduation, rather than continuing on into theoretical or research-oriented programs.

== See also ==
- Practitioner-scholar model
- Rush University
- Scientist-Practitioner Model
