= New Zealand Society of Physiotherapists =

The New Zealand Society of Physiotherapists (NZSP) is a professional body of physiotherapists in New Zealand. Membership of the society is optional, but demonstrates that a particular practitioner upholds certain standards including adherence to a code of conduct. Individuals who meet certain criteria may indicate their membership by using the letters MNZSP or FNZSP after their names.

== History ==
The society was established in 1950.

The motto, in Māori, is "kia akotahi tatou, kia kotahi ra" (let's learn and grow together).

== Branches ==
The society is made up of branches which represent geographical regions around the country. Each member of the society belongs to and is represented by a branch for the region in which they reside.

The branches are:

- Auckland
- Canterbury
- Hawkes Bay
- Middle Districts
- Nelson and Marlborough
- Northland
- North Shore City
- Otago
- Southland
- Waikato and Bay of Plenty
- Wellington

== Membership classes ==
- Member: Must be a New Zealand registered physiotherapist. A member may use the letters 'MNZSP' to indicate their membership.
- Associate: This is the class held by a student who wishes to join the society.
- Affiliate: A physiotherapy assistant working under supervision of a registered physiotherapist may hold this class.
- Fellow: This class is bestowed upon members at the discretion of the society. Those with this class of membership may use the letters FNZSP.

== Special interest groups ==
The society also supports a number of groups of practitioners who are interested in particular specialities within the profession. Membership of a special interest group is optional. The following special interest groups exist:

- Cardiothoracic
- Continence and Women's Health
- Hand Therapists
- Neurology
- New Zealand Manipulative Physiotherapists Association
- New Zealand Private Physiotherapy Association
- New Zealand Sports and Orthopaedic Physiotherapy Association
- Occupational Health
- Paediatric
- Physiotherapy Acupuncture Association of New Zealand
- Physiotherapy for the Older Adult
- Stress Management and Related Therapies
