= Nigeria Society of Physiotherapy =

The Nigeria Society of Physiotherapy (NSP) is the national professional association representing Nigerian-trained physiotherapists as well as foreign-trained physiotherapists practicing in Nigeria. The society was inaugurated on 29 August 1959 at a meeting held the Physiotherapy Department of the University College Hospital, Ibadan by a group of Nigerian and British Physiotherapists.

The objective was the desirability and need for a professional organization. A constitution and bylaws were drafted for ratification at the General Meeting.

The first General Meeting of the Society was held on 28 November 1959 in Lagos at a physiotherapist's home. Sixteen people were present including the founder members. Within a short period (1961–1962) the society was recognised by the Federal Government and other Regional Governments. It was the only body that had the power to negotiate with the governments. State chapters of the society emerged after a few years.

== World Confederation for Physical Therapy ==
The existence of the NSP was made known in 1960 to the World Confederation for Physical Therapy (WCPT) with the view of becoming a member.

On application, the NSP was granted provisional membership in 1966. It was invited in 1967 to the 5th International Congress of the WCPT which took place in Melbourne, Australia. Three NSP members, Messrs Ajao, Kehinde, and Mrs. Aboderin, were present at the congress where NSP was formally admitted as a full member of the WCPT on 18 May 1967. Since then, members of the NSP have attended the International Congress held by the WCPT, with some occupying positions in the executive committee.

== History of physiotherapy education ==
The physiotherapy profession was imported into Nigeria in 1945 by two British Chartered Physiotherapists, Miss Manfield, and Mr. Williams, and the setting was the Royal (now National) Orthopaedic Hospital, Igbobi, Nigeria. They were employed by the Nigerian national government and charged with the responsibility of treating wounded and disabled Nigerian soldiers who returned home from Burma and other war fronts during World War II, as well as starting a training program in physiotherapy (Oshin, 1986). Similar to the UK, Australia, and the US, physiotherapy education in Nigeria began within the hospital setting. The two British Chartered Physiotherapists (Miss Manfield and Mr. Williams) employed by the Nigerian national government, launched a three-year diploma program to train assistant physiotherapists. Several of the individuals who graduated from the program subsequently proceeded to the UK for further studies to become Chartered Physiotherapists. Eventually, the training program at Igbobi was discontinued, and a degree program was initiated.

The quest for excellence in physiotherapy education in Nigeria was shaped, decades ago, by the decision of the NSP to upgrade the first physiotherapy training program located within the Royal (Now National) Orthopedic Hospital at Igbobi, Lagos to a university setting (Oshin, 1986). A Bachelor of Science in physiotherapy (BSc-PT) was launched at the University of Ibadan (UI) in October 1966. The UI program was followed in 1971 by the College of Medicine, University of Lagos (CMUL) diploma program which was elevated to a degree program in 1977. A Bachelor of Medical Rehabilitation-Physiotherapy (BMR-PT) degree program was inaugurated in 1977 at the University of Ile-Ife, today Obafemi Awolowo University (OAU).

The UI and CMUL curricula were patterned after the British model of education. This development is not surprising, given that the pioneering physiotherapist educators in Nigeria, Dr. Abayomi Oshin, and the late Associate Professor Gabriel Odia, obtained their initial professional education (MCSP and Teacher's Diploma) from the UK. Conversely, the BMR-PT curriculum at OAU followed the course unit system that is a standard practice in the US and Canadian universities. The OAU curriculum was designed by the late Professor Vincent Nwuga, who received his professional education from the UK, Canadian, and American universities.

Between 1966 and 1997, physiotherapy education in Nigeria was a four-year program leading to a Bachelor of Science degree. In 1998, the curriculum in all the Universities was upgraded to a five-year professional Bachelor of Physiotherapy (BPT) or a BMR-PT degree. Also, graduates were mandated to complete a one-year clinical internship before being granted a license to practice. The period between 1985 and 2004 witnessed the development of the second generation of physiotherapy education programs in the country. Going forward, the period between 2013 and 2016 marked the third generation of physiotherapy education programs in Nigeria. The first master's degree program in physiotherapy in Nigeria was initiated at OAU in 1985. Mrs. Mabogunje, the first program graduate, completed her degree in 1987. The first Ph.D. degree program in physiotherapy in Nigeria was launched at the UI in 1997 where the first graduate of the program, Dr. T.K. Hamzat, graduated in 2000. Today, six of the twelve Nigerian universities offering physiotherapy education programs provide post-professional (MS and Ph.D.) degrees in physiotherapy (Balogun et al., 2016 a & b). Despite these critical strides, the entry-level education for physiotherapy practice in Nigeria is still at the baccalaureate degree level. The yearning for entry-level DPT education by Nigerian physiotherapists has been in the offing for more than two decades. A proposal submitted to the National Universities Commission by the NSP and Medical Rehabilitation Therapist Board (MRTB) is awaiting approval.

== Pan African Congress/Africa Physiotherapy Organisation ==
The First Pan-African Physiotherapy Congress was held in the Old Great Hall, College of Medicine, and LUTH by the NSP on 28 May – 3 June 1979. The Congress was a processor of the African Physiotherapy Organisation. The executive committee of the Organisation met in Cairo, Egypt.

The society has not only organized its annual scientific conferences and meetings since its inception, it also provides continuous professional development forums for members and other health professionals. The official journal for research publication is the Journal of the Nigeria Society of Physiotherapy. The society advocates for events relating to physical therapy, physical fitness, quality of life and wellness of the Nigerian Nation.The benchmark curriculum of training in Nigeria for a physiotherapy degree in the university is the Bachelor of Physiotherapy (B. Physio) and the society is looking to harness efforts with other stakeholders to upgrade the curriculum to Doctor of Physiotherapy (DPT). This led to talks with the faculty of the University of Michigan-Flint over two years ago and an alliance was struck to commence the transitional DPT program. The first set of Nigerian students graduated in May 2013.
