= Association of University Programs in Health Administration =

The Association of University Programs in Health Administration (AUPHA) is a non-profit organization of university-based educational programs, faculty, practitioners, and health care provider organizations.

It works to improve the delivery of health services through the educational of health care administrators. AUPHA also administers Upsilon Phi Delta, the national academic honor society for health administration students.

Dan Gentry joined the AUPHA staff in March 2020 as President and CEO.

== See also ==
- William B. Graham Prize for Health Services Research
- Commission on the Accreditation of Healthcare Management Education
