= Alan Williams (economist) =

British economist

- Born: Alan Harold Williams; 9 June 1927; Birmingham
- Died: 2 June 2005 (aged 77); York
- Education: University of Birmingham
- Occupation: Health economist

Alan Williams (9 June 1927 – 2 June 2005) was a British economist.

He was a professor of economics at the University of York and aided the development of health economics in Britain from the late 1960s to the mid 2000s. One of his papers was in 1997 deemed by experts to be the most influential book or article published in the 25-year history of health economics. Williams was an advocate of the quality-adjusted life year (QALY) as a measure of healthcare benefit and his work arguably influenced the creation of the National Institute for Clinical Excellence in 1999. A fellowship has been set up in his honour.
