= Upsilon Phi Delta =

American healthcare student group

- ΥΦΔ
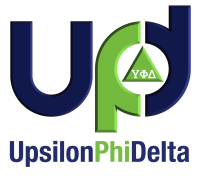
- Founded: 1965; 61 years ago
- Type: Honor
- Affiliation: AUPHA
- Status: Active
- Emphasis: Healthcare administration
- Scope: National
- Colors: Green and Blue
- Flower: Rose
- Publication: AUPHA Exchange
- Chapters: 134
- Headquarters: c/o AUPHA; 1730 Rhode Island Ave NW; Suite 810; Washington D.C. 20036; United States
- Website: www.aupha.org/main/resourcecenter/currentstudents/honorsociety

Upsilon Phi Delta (ΥΦΔ) is a United States honor society for college students and individuals in the field of healthcare administration. The society was formed in 1965 to recognize and support academic excellence health administration students and to advance the profession. It is a member of the Association of University Programs in Health Administration, which oversees it operations.

== History ==
Upsilon Phi Delta was organized as a collaborative effort of groups at Seton Hall University, Towson University, the University of Baltimore, the University of Memphis, and the University of Scranton. These groups worked without a constitution to bring about a national society. Later, groups from ten colleges drafted bylaws for the honor society, establishing its charter members on September 1, 1999. These charter members are:

- Georgetown University
- University of Arkansas
- University of Florida
- University of Houston-Clear Lake
- University of Minnesota
- University of New Hampshire
- University of North Florida
- University of South Carolina
- University of Washington
- Washington University

The mission of the society is "to recognize, reward, and encourage academic excellence in the study of health administration".

== Symbols ==
The name of the society is derived from the Greek words Υγείας (health), Φροντίδα (care), and Διοίκηση (to administer or lead). Its colors are crimson red and blue. Its flower is the rose.

== Membership ==
Student members of Upsilon Phi Delta are admitted in the semester before their graduation in a healthcare administration program. They are selected based on cumulative grades, community service, and/or contribution to the healthcare management profession. In addition to students, faculty, healthcare administrations, healthcare executives, and individuals who contribute to the field of healthcare administration can also join as alumni or honorary members.

== Chapters ==
Following is a list of the chapters of Upsilon Phi Delta. Most chapters accept both undergraduate and graduate students. Some chapters are limited to graduate (G) or undergraduate (U) students, as indicated by the type below.

Chapters	Chartered	Type	Location	Status	References
Appalachian State University		U	Boone, North Carolina	Active	
A.T. Still University				Active	
Auburn University			Auburn, Alabama	Active	
Baptist Health Sciences University			Memphis, Tennessee	Active	
Barry University			Miami Shores, Florida	Active	
Baylor University			Waco, Texas	Active	
Belmont Abbey College			Belmont, North Carolina	Active	
Boston University School of Public Health			Boston, Massachusetts	Active	
California Northstate University			Elk Grove, California	Inactive?	
California State University, Chico			Chico, California	Active	
California State University, Long Beach	2016	U	Long Beach, California	Active	
California State University, Northridge		U	Los Angeles, California	Active	
Clayton State University College of Health		U	Morrow, Georgia	Active	
Colorado Technical University		G	Colorado Springs, Colorado	Active	
Cornell University Sloan Program in Health Administration			Ithaca, New York	Active	
Creighton University			Omaha, Nebraska	Active	
Davenport University College of Health Professions Health Services Administration		U	Grand Rapids, Michigan	Active	
East Carolina University			Greenville, North Carolina	Active	
Eastern Kentucky University			Richmond, Kentucky	Active	
Eastern Virginia Medical School			Norfolk, Virginia	Active	
Florida A&M University		U	Tallahassee, Florida	Active	
Florida Atlantic University		G	Tallahassee, Florida	Active	
Florida Atlantic University		U	Tallahassee, Florida	Active	
Florida Gulf Coast University		G	Fort Myers, Florida	Active	
Florida Gulf Coast University		U	Fort Myers, Florida	Active	
Franciscan Missionaries of Our Lady University			Baton Rouge, Louisiana	Active	
George Mason University		G	Fairfax, Virginia	Active	
George Mason University		U	Fairfax, Virginia	Active	
George Washington University			Washington, D.C.	Active	
Georgetown University	September 1, 1999	G	Washington, D.C.	Active	
Georgetown University	September 1, 1999	U	Washington, D.C.	Active	
Georgia Southern University			Statesboro, Georgia	Active	
Georgia State University			Atlanta, Georgia	Active	
Governors State University		G	University Park, Illinois	Active	
Governors State University		U	University Park, Illinois	Active	
Grand Valley State University			Allendale, Michigan	Active	
Hampton University			Hampton, Virginia	Active	
Hofstra University			Nassau County, New York	Active	
Howard University			Washington, D.C.	Active	
Icahn School of Medicine at Mount Sinai			New York City, New York	Active	
Indiana University Indianapolis Richard M. Fairbanks School of Public Health		G	Indianapolis, Indiana	Active	
Iowa State University			Ames, Iowa	Active	
Johns Hopkins University		G	Baltimore, Maryland	Active	
King's College	2022		Wilkes-Barre, Pennsylvania	Active	
Long Island University		U		Active	
Loyola University Chicago		U	Chicago, Illinois	Active	
Medical University of South Carolina		G	Charleston, South Carolina	Active	
Methodist University			Fayetteville, North Carolina	Active	
Metropolitan State University of Denver		G	Denver, Colorado.	Active	
Metropolitan State University of Denver		U	Denver, Colorado.	Active	
National University			virtual	Inactive	
Norfolk State University		U	Norfolk, Virginia	Active	
Northeastern University		U	Boston, Massachusetts	Active	
Ohio State University			Columbus, Ohio	Active	
Old Dominion University			Norfolk, Virginia	Active	
Palm Beach State College			Lake Worth Beach, Florida	Active	
Pennsylvania College of Health Sciences			Lancaster, Pennsylvania	Active	
Pennsylvania State University			Harrisburg, Pennsylvania	Active	
Pennsylvania State University		U	University Park, Pennsylvania	Active	
Pfeiffer University			Misenheimer, North Carolina	Active	
Portland State University			Portland, Oregon	Active	
Queens University of Charlotte			Charlotte, North Carolina	Active	
Radford University		G	Radford University	Active	
Radford University		U	Radford University	Active	
Robert Morris University			Moon Township, Pennsylvania	Active	
Rush University			Chicago, Illinois	Active	
Rutgers University–New Brunswick		G	New Brunswick, New Jersey	Active	
Rutgers University–New Brunswick		U	New Brunswick, New Jersey	Active	
Saint Louis University		G	St. Louis, Missouri	Active	
Samford University		G	Homewood, Alabama	Active	
Samford University		U	Homewood, Alabama	Active	
Seton Hall University			South Orange, New Jersey	Active	
Stevenson University Online			virtual	Active	
Stonehill College			Easton, Massachusetts	Active	
Stony Brook University Program in Public Health			Stony Brook, New York	Active	
Tennessee State University			Nashville, Tennessee	Active	
Texas A&M University School of Public Health			Bryan, Texas	Active	
Texas A&M University–Corpus Christi			Corpus Christi, Texas	Active	
Texas Southern University		G	Houston, Texas	Active	
Texas Southern University		U	Houston, Texas	Active	
Texas State University		G	San Marcos, Texas	Active	
Texas State University		U	San Marcos, Texas	Active	
Texas Woman's University Institute of Health Sciences Houston Center			Denton, Texas	Active	
Towson University			Towson, Maryland	Active	
Trinity University	2010	G	San Antonio, Texas	Active	
Trinity University	2010		San Antonio, Texas	Active	
University of Alabama at Birmingham		G	Birmingham, Alabama	Active	
University of Alabama at Birmingham		U	Birmingham, Alabama	Active	
University of Arkansas	September 1, 1999		Fayetteville, Arkansas	Inactive	
University of Arkansas for Medical Sciences			Little Rock, Arkansas	Active	
University of Baltimore			Baltimore, Maryland	Active	
University of California, Los Angeles			Los Angeles, California	Active	
University of Central Florida		G	Orlando, Florida	Active	
University of Central Florida		U	Orlando, Florida	Active	
University of Detroit Mercy			Detroit, Michigan	Active	
University of Florida	September 1, 1999		Gainesville, Florida	Active	
University of Georgia			Athens, Georgia	Active	
University of Houston–Clear Lake	September 1, 1999		Chicago, Illinois	Active	
University of Illinois Chicago			Chicago, Illinois	Active	
University of Iowa			Iowa City, Iowa	Active	
University of Kentucky		G	Lexington, Kentucky	Active	
University of Louisville			Louisville, Kentucky	Active	
University of Maryland Global Campus			Adelphi, Maryland	Active	
University of Memphis		G	Memphis, Tennessee	Active	
University of Miami		G	Coral Gables, Florida	Active	
University of Michigan–Flint			Flint, Michigan	Active	
University of Minnesota	September 1, 1999	G	Minneapolis, Minnesota	Active	
University of Minnesota Duluth			Duluth, Minnesota	Active	
University of Minnesota School of Public Health, Executive MHA			Minneapolis, Minnesota	Active	
University of Missouri			Columbia, Missouri	Active	
University of New Hampshire	September 1, 1999		Columbia, Missouri	Active	
University of New Haven			West Haven, Connecticut	Active	
University of New Orleans			New Orleans, Louisiana	Active	
University of North Carolina at Charlotte Department of Public Health Sciences	2010		Charlotte, North Carolina	Active	
University of North Carolina Wilmington			Wilmington, North Carolina	Active	
University of North Florida	September 1, 1999	G	Jacksonville, Florida	Active	
University of North Florida	September 1, 1999	U	Jacksonville, Florida	Active	
University of North Texas Health Science Center			Fort Worth, Texas	Active	
University of Phoenix College of Health Professions		G	virtual	Active	
University of Phoenix College of Health Professions		U	virtual	Active	
University of Pittsburgh			Pittsburgh, Pennsylvania	Active	
University of Scranton		G	Scranton, Pennsylvania	Active	
University of Scranton		U	Scranton, Pennsylvania	Active	
University of South Carolina	September 1, 1999		Columbia, South Carolina	Active	
University of South Dakota			Vermillion, South Dakota	Active	
University of Southern California Price			Los Angeles, California	Active	
University of Southern Indiana			Evansville, Indiana	Active	
University of Texas at Arlington			Arlington, Texas	Active	
University of Texas Health Science Center at Tyler			Tyler, Texas	Active	
University of the Incarnate Word			San Antonio, Texas	Active	
University of Virginia			Charlottesville, Virginia	Active	
University of Washington Seattle	September 1, 1999		Seattle, Washington	Active	
University of Wisconsin–Milwaukee			Milwaukee, Wisconsin	Active	
Utah Tech University			St. George, Utah	Active	
Virginia Commonwealth University		G	Richmond, Virginia	Active	
Washington University	September 1, 1999			Inactive	
Weber State University Department of Health Administrative Services		G	Ogden, Utah	Active	
Weber State University Department of Health Administrative Services		U	Ogden, Utah	Active	
West Virginia University		G	Morgantown, West Virginia	Active	
West Virginia University		U	Morgantown, West Virginia	Active	
Winthrop University			Rock Hill, South Carolina	Active	
Xavier University		G	Cincinnati, Ohio	Active	
Xavier University		U	Cincinnati, Ohio	Active	

== See also ==
- Professional fraternities and sororities
- Master of Health Administration
- Bachelor of Science in Public Health
