= Master of Physical Therapy =

The Master of Physical Therapy (MPT or MSPT) is a post baccalaureate degree conferred upon successful completion of an accredited physical therapy professional education program.

== United States ==
Successful candidates are then qualified to apply for and take the Physical Therapy national licensure exam (in their particular state); students who pass this exam are then licensed as Physical Therapists (and may typically use the designation MPT or simply PT).

Until the late 1990s, Physical therapy education was structured as a Bachelor's Degree. Those who completed the program were qualified to apply for the exam (and to subsequently enter Physical Therapy practice). However, with the ongoing support of the American Physical Therapy Association (the accrediting organization for all American PT academic programs), the bachelor's degree in physical therapy was slowly replaced by the Master of Physical Therapy. Physical therapy education is currently transitioning to a clinical doctorate, the Doctor of Physical Therapy degree, with the majority of current programs offering the DPT.
