= Commission on Accreditation in Physical Therapy Education =

The Commission on Accreditation in Physical Therapy Education (CAPTE) is the agency recognized by the United States Department of Education for granting accreditation status to entry-level education programs for physical therapists and physical therapist assistants. The stated mission of CAPTE includes "establishing and applying standards that assure quality and continuous improvement in the entry-level preparation of physical therapists and physical therapist assistants and that reflect the evolving nature of education, research, and practice".

It is based in Alexandria, Virginia.

As of 16 December, 2011, CAPTE recognizes 200 educational institutions supporting 210 accredited programs for PTs and 259 institutions supporting 280 accredited programs for PTAs.

== See also ==
- American Physical Therapy Association
- Physical therapy
- Physical therapy education
