= List of doctoral degrees in the US =

There are a wide variety of doctoral degrees awarded to students in a number of different categories in the United States. Doctorates are not restricted to being based solely on research or academic coursework.

== Historical background ==
The first research doctorate was the doctor of philosophy, which came to the U.S. from Germany, and is frequently referred to by its initials of Ph.D. As academia evolved in the country a wide variety of other types of doctoral degrees and programs were developed. Some of these included a focus on teaching such as the Doctor of Arts, others were simply a more specific curricula within a specific field such as the Doctor of Engineering, Doctor of Education, or Doctor of Business Administration which may be identical in requirements, length, coursework and research to the Ph.D.

Additionally, there are a number of lower level (in terms of academic advancement) professional doctorates such as the Doctor of Medicine and the Juris Doctor that do not have a dissertation research component. In contrast to other countries worldwide a doctoral program generally requires the completion of a program of academic coursework in addition to other requirements for all types of doctoral degrees.

== Types of doctorate ==
The United States Department of Education published a Structure of US Education in 2008 that differentiated between associate degrees, bachelor's degrees, first professional degrees, master's degrees, intermediate graduate qualifications and research doctorates. This included doctoral degrees in the first professional degree, intermediate graduate qualification and research doctorate degree categories.

The Department of Education's National Center for Education Statistics divides U.S. doctorates into three categories for the purposes of its Integrated Postsecondary Education Data System (IPEDS): Doctor's degree-research/scholarship, Doctor's degree-professional practice and Doctor's degree-other. The Doctor's degree-research/scholarship is defined as "A Ph.D. or other doctor's degree that requires advanced work beyond the master's level, including the preparation and defense of a dissertation based on original research, or the planning and execution of an original project demonstrating substantial artistic or scholarly achievement." The Doctor's degree-professional practice is unofficially known as "doctor's degree" in the U.S. that is conferred upon completion of a program providing the knowledge and skills for the recognition, credential, or license required for professional practice but is defined by the department of education as a professional degree that lawyers and physicians complete to practice in their vocations. The degree is awarded after a period of study such that the total time to the degree, including both pre-professional and professional preparation, equals at least six full-time equivalent academic years." The Doctor's degree-other is defined as "A doctor's degree that does not meet the definition of a doctor's degree – research/scholarship or a doctor's degree – professional practice." The categorization of degrees for IPEDS is left to the awarding institutes.

The National Science Foundation (NSF) has published an annual census of research doctorates called the Survey of Earned Doctorates (SED) since 1957 with sponsorship from the NSF, NASA, the National Institutes of Health, the National Endowment for the Humanities, the U.S. Department of Agriculture, and the U.S. Department of Education. For the purposes of this survey, a research doctorate is defined as "a doctoral degree that (1) requires completion of an original intellectual contribution in the form of a dissertation or an equivalent culminating project (e.g., musical composition) and (2) is not primarily intended as a degree for the practice of a profession." The second point here – that a research doctorate is "not primarily intended as a degree for the practice of a profession" means that not all doctorates containing "an original intellectual contribution in the form of a dissertation or an equivalent culminating project" are regarded as research doctorates by the NSF. The NSF list of research doctorates is recognized internationally as establishing which U.S. doctorates are considered Ph.D.-equivalent, e.g. by the European Research Council.

The Department of Education's 2008 Structure of US Education listed 24 frequently awarded research doctorates titles accepted by the National Science Foundation (NSF) as representing "degrees equivalent in content and level to the Ph.D". This reflected the 24 doctorates recognized by the NSF in Doctorate Recipients from U.S. Universities: Summary Report 2005. As of Doctorate Recipients from U.S. Universities: Summary Report 2006 this was reduced to 18, part of an ongoing program of assessment that saw the number of recognized research degrees reduced from the 52 recognized from 1994 (the earliest report archived online) to 1998, falling to 48 from 1999 to 2003 and to 24 in 2004. The number rose to 20 in 2007, with the Doctor of Design and Doctor of Fine Arts being re-recognized after being removed from the 2006 list, before falling again to 18 in 2008 when the Doctor of Music and Doctor of Industrial Technology were dropped. Since then, the list of recognized research degrees has been constant, although most Ed.D. degree programs were determined to have a professional rather than research focus and removed from the survey in 2010–2011; despite this, the Ed.D. remains the second most popular research doctorate in the SED after the Ph.D in 2022. (albeit with 0.9% of awards compared to 98.6% for the Ph.D.).

== Research doctorates ==
In the United States the doctoral degrees that have been identified by various universities and others (including the NSF at various times) as having original research including a dissertation or equivalent have included:

Degree	Abbreviation	Identified by	Notes
Doctor of Architecture	D.Arch.	NSF (to 2003)	
Doctor of Arts	D.A.	NSF	
Doctor of Arts in Teaching	D.A.T.	NSF (to 2003)	As alternative name for Doctor of Arts
Doctor of Applied Science	D.A.S.	NSF (to 2003)	
Doctor of Business Administration	D.B.A.	NSF	
Doctor of Canon Law	J.C.D.	NSF	
Doctor of Chemistry	D.Chem.	NSF (to 2003)	
Doctor of Church Music	D.C.M.	NSF (to 2005)	
Doctor of Criminal Justice	D.C.J.	NSF (to 2003)	
Doctor of Criminology	D.Crim.	NSF (to 2003)	
Doctor of Comparative/Civil Law	D.C.L.	NSF (to 2003)	
Doctor of Design	D.Des.	NSF (from 2007)	
Doctor of Design	Dr.DES	NSF (to 2005)	
Doctor of Education	Ed.D.	NSF	Most programs not considered research degrees by NSF from 2010/11
Doctor of Engineering	D.Eng./D.E.Sc./D.E.S	NSF	
Doctor of Environment	D.Env.	NSF (to 2003)	
Doctor of Fine Arts	D.F.A.	NSF	Not included in NSF list for 2006
Doctor of Forestry	D.F.	NSF (to 2003)	
Doctor of Geological Science	D.G.S.	NSF (to 2003)	
Doctor of Health and Safety	D.H.S.	NSF (to 2003)	
Doctor of Hebrew Letters/Literature	D.H.L.	NSF	
Doctor of Hebrew Studies	D.H.S.	NSF (to 2003)	
Doctor of Industrial Technology	D.I.T.	NSF (to 2007)	
Doctor of Juridical Science	J.S.D./S.J.D.	NSF	
Doctor of Juristic Science	J.S.D.	NSF (to 2003)	
Doctor of Library Science	D.L.S.	NSF (to 2003)	
Doctor of Medical Science	D.M.Sc	NSF (to 2003)	
Doctor of Missiology	D.Miss	NSF (to 1998)	
Doctor of Music	D.M.	NSF (to 2007)	
Doctor of Music Education	D.M.E.	NSF	
Doctor of Music Ministry	D.M.M.	NSF (to 2003)	
Doctor of Musical Arts	D.M.A.	NSF	
Doctor of Modern Languages	D.M.L.	NSF	
Doctor of Nursing Science	D.N.Sc.	NSF	
Doctor of Philosophy	Ph.D.	NSF	
Doctor of Physical Education	D.P.E.	NSF (to 2005)	
Doctor of Professional Studies	D.P.S.	NSF (to 2003)	
Doctor of Public Administration	D.P.A.	NSF (to 2005); Brewer et al. (1999)	
Doctor of Public Health	Dr.P.H.	NSF	
Doctor of Recreation	D.Rec./D.R.	NSF (to 2003)	
Doctor of Rehabilitation	Rh.D.	NSF (to 2003)	
Doctor of Religious Education	D.R.E.	NSF (to 1998)	
Doctor of Sacred Music	D.S.M.	NSF (to 2003)	
Doctor of Sacred Theology	S.T.D.	NSF	Removed from NSF list from 1999, restored in 2004
Doctor of Science	D.Sc./Sc.D.	NSF	
Doctor of Science and Hygiene	D.Sc.H.	NSF (to 2003)	
Doctor of Science in Dentistry	D.Sc.D.	NSF (to 2003)	
Doctor of Science in Veterinary Medicine	D.Sc.V.M.	NSF (to 2003)	
Doctor of the Science of Law	L.Sc.D.	NSF (to 2003)	
Doctor of Social Science	D.S.Sc.	NSF (to 2003)	
Doctor of Social Work	D.S.W.	NSF (to 2005)	
Doctor of Theology	Th.D.	NSF	

== Professional doctorates ==
In addition to the research doctorate, the US has many professional degrees, formerly referred to as first-professional degrees. These are titled as doctor's degrees and classified as "doctors degree – professional practice". While research doctorates require "advanced work beyond the master's level, including the preparation and defense of a dissertation based on original research, or the planning and execution of an original project demonstrating substantial artistic or scholarly achievement", professional doctorates must have a total time to degree (including prior study at bachelor's level) of at least six years, and provide "the knowledge and skills for the recognition, credential, or license required for professional practice".

Professional Service	Doctoral Degree in the United States	Abbreviation	First awarded	Original/Founding Degree(s) in the United States
Acupuncture	Doctor of Acupuncture	D.Ac.		MAC 1981
Athletic Training	Doctor of Athletic Training	D.A.T		
Audiology	Doctor of Audiology	Au.D.	1996	MA/MS post-WWII
Behavioral Health	Doctor of Behavioral Health	D.B.H.	2010	
Chiropractor	Doctor of Chiropractic	D.C.	1927	
Clinical Laboratory Science	Doctor of Clinical Laboratory Science	D.C.L.S.	2018	
Computer Science	Doctor of Computer Science	D.C.Sc.	1965 (first Ph.D. in computer science, not first D.C.Sc)	
Counseling	Doctor of Professional Counseling	D.P.C.	1972	
Dentistry	Doctor of Dental Surgery; Doctor of Dental Medicine	D.D.S. D.M.D.	See M.D. degree	
Economic Development	Doctor of Economic Development	D.E.D.	2008	
Health Administration	Doctor of Health Administration	D.H.A.		
Health Science	Doctor of Health Science	D.H.Sc.	1914 (see DPH)	
Law	Juris Doctor; Doctor of Law; Doctor of Jurisprudence	J.D.	"Graduate of Laws" 1792; LL.B (Bachelor of Laws) 1840	
Law and Policy	Doctor of Law and Policy	D.L.P.	2009	
Management	Doctor of Management	D.M. D.Mgt	1995	
Medical Physics	Doctor of Medical Physics	D.M.P.	2010	
Medical Science	Doctor of Medical Science	D.M.S.	2016, Lincoln Memorial University	
Medicine	Doctor of Medicine	M.D.	M.B. (Bachelor of Medicine) 1769	
Ministry (clergy)	Doctor of Ministry	D.Min.		
Ministry (clergy)	Doctor of Practical Theology	D.P.Th.		
Ministry (clergy)	Doctor of Biblical Studies	D.B.S.		
Ministry (clergy)	Doctor of Educational Ministry	DEDMIN		
Ministry (clergy)	Doctor of Religious Science	Dr. rel. sc.		
Ministry (clergy)	Doctor of (Christian) Ethics in Medicine	D.M. (DM), also in Latin Dr. eth. med.		
Ministry (clergy)	Doctor of Bible Exposition	D.B.E.		
Ministry (clergy)	Doctor of Ecclesiastical Philosophy	Dr. eccl. phil.		
Ministry (clergy)	Professor of Ecclesiastical Sciences and Theology (in faith-based institution of higher education)	Prof. eccl.		
Ministry (clergy)	Doctor of Worship Studies	D.W.S.		
Ministry (clergy)	Doctor of Transformational Leadership	DTL		
Music	Doctor of Church Music	D.C.M.		
Music	Doctor of Pastoral Music	D.P.M.		
Music	Doctor of Sacred Music	D.S.M.		
Naturopathy	Doctor of Naturopathic Medicine	N.D. or N.M.D	1901 see Naturopathy	
Nursing	Doctor of Nursing Practice; Doctor of Nurse Anesthesia Practice	D.N.P. D.N.A.P.	2005	
Occupational Therapy	Doctor of Occupational Therapy	O.T.D. or D.O.T.	1998	
Optometry	Doctor of Optometry	O.D.	1889	See M.D. degree
Osteopathic Medicine	Doctor of Osteopathic Medicine	D.O.	1892	See M.D. degree
Policy and Law	Doctor of Law and Policy	D.L.P.		
Pharmacy	Doctor of Pharmacy	Pharm.D.	"Graduate of Pharmacy" 1826; B.S. in Pharmacy (Bachelor of Science in Pharmacy) 1938	
Physical Therapy	Doctor of Physical Therapy	D.P.T.	1992	
Podiatry	Doctor of Podiatric Medicine	D.P.M.	1915	D.S.C. (Doctor of Surgical Chiropody) 1912; See M.D. degree
Psychoanalysis	Doctor of Psychoanalysis	Psya.D. or D.Psa.		
Psychology	Doctor of Psychology	Psy.D.	>1973	
Public Health	Doctor of Public Health	DrPH, Dr.P.H. or D.P.H.	1911	
Social Worker	Doctor of Social Work	D.S.W.		
Speech-Language Pathology	Doctor of Speech-Language Pathology	S.L.P.D.		
Veterinary medicine	Doctor of Veterinary Medicine	D.V.M./V.M.D.	1876	B.V.S. (Bachelor of Veterinary Science) 1871

== Other doctorates ==
There are also some programs leading to awards titled as doctorates that meet neither the definition of the research doctorate nor those of the professional doctorate. These are classified as "doctor's degree – other".
