= Ultra-large-scale systems =

Ultra-large-scale system (ULSS) is a term used in fields including computer science, software engineering and systems engineering to refer to systems with high amounts of hardware, lines of source code, numbers of users, and volumes of data. These systems often face challenges that are less common in smaller scale systems. The term "ultra-large-scale system" was introduced by Northrop and others to describe challenges facing the United States Department of Defense and has subsequently been used to discuss challenges in many areas, including the computerization of financial markets. The term is sometimes used interchangeably with the term "large-scale complex IT system" (LSCITS).

== Background ==
The term "ultra-large-scale system" was introduced in a 2006 report from the Software Engineering Institute at Carnegie Mellon University authored by Linda Northrop and colleagues. The report explained that software intensive systems are reaching unprecedented scales in terms of:

- lines of code
- numbers of users and stakeholders
- purposes the system is put to
- amounts of data stored, accessed, manipulated and refined
- numbers of connections to other systems
- interdependencies among components
- numbers of hardware elements

The report argued that when systems become ultra-large-scale, traditional approaches to engineering and management are no longer adequate and that the problem is no longer of engineering systems or systems of systems, but of engineering "socio-technical ecosystems". In 2013, Linda Northrop and her team reviewed the 2006 study against the reality of 2013 and concluded that ULS systems are in the midst of society and their impact on its social fabric and institutions are significant. The review concluded that the original 2006 research team was probably too conservative in their report and that recent technologies have exacerbated the pace of scale growth.

In 2009, a research and training initiative on Large-scale Complex IT Systems was initiated in the UK. Many of the challenges recognized in this initiative were similar to those recognized in ULS systems. Director of the UK initiative Dave Cliff stated: "The ULSS proposal and the LSCITS proposal were written entirely independently, yet we came to very similar conclusions about what needs to be done and about how to do it".

When comparing, it must be noted that the UK initiative on LSCIT systems had a scope of five to ten years in the future, whereas the US review on ULS systems had a much wider scope. Richard Gabriel, for example, stated that ULS systems are desirable but currently impossible to build due to limitations in the fields of software design and systems engineering, whereas Ian Sommerville's perspective is that LSCIT systems are already emerging (for example in air traffic control), the key problem being not how to achieve them but how to ensure they are adequately engineered.

== Characteristics of an ultra-large-scale system ==
The Northrop report states that, in addition to the characteristics of systems of systems, a ULSS:

- Has decentralized data, development, evolution and operational control.
- Addresses inherently conflicting, unknowable, and diverse requirements.
- Evolves continuously while operating, with capabilities being deployed and removed.
- Contains heterogeneous, inconsistent and changing elements.
- Erodes the people-system-boundary. People will not just be users, but elements of the system and affecting its overall emergent behavior.
- Encounters failure as the norm, rather than the exception, with it being extremely unlikely that all components are functioning at any one time.
- Requires new paradigms for acquisition and policy, and new methods for control.

The report further states that: "The sheer scale of ULS systems will change everything. ULS systems will place unprecedented demands on software acquisition, production, deployment, management, documentation, usage, and evolution practices."

== Domains ==
Although the term ULSS was initially introduced to discuss challenges faced by the United States Department of Defense, Greg Goth in 2008 elaborated that the term has since been used to describe challenges in other domains as well.

=== Defense ===
The Northrop report argued that "The U.S. Department of Defense (DoD) has a goal of information dominance. [...] This goal depends on increasingly complex systems characterized by thousands of platforms, sensors, decision nodes, weapons, and warfighters connected through heterogeneous wired and wireless networks. [...] These systems will push far beyond the size of today's systems by every measure. [...] They will be ultra-large-scale systems."

=== Financial trading ===
Following the 2010 Flash Crash, Cliff and Northrop have argued "The very high degree of interconnectedness in the global markets means that entire trading systems, implemented and managed separately by independent organizations, can rightfully be considered as significant constituent entities in the larger global super-system. [...] The sheer number of human agents and computer systems connected within the global financial-markets system-of-systems is so large that it is an instance of an ultra-large-scale system, and that largeness-of-scale has significant effects on the nature of the system".

=== Healthcare ===
Kevin Sullivan has stated that the US healthcare system is "clearly an ultra-large-scale system" and that building national scale cyberinfrastructure for healthcare "demands not just a rigorous, modern software and systems engineering effort, but an approach at the cutting edge of our understanding of information processing systems and their development and deployment in complex socio-technical environments".

=== Others ===
Other domains said to be experiencing a rise of ultra-large-scale systems include government, transport systems (for example air traffic control systems), energy distribution systems (for example smart grids) and large enterprises.

== Research ==
=== In the United States ===
The Northrop report proposed that a portfolio of interdisciplinary research be developed, following a ULS systems research agenda that highlights the following areas:

Adaptable and predictable system quality

ULS systems will be long-running and must operate robustly in environments fraught with failures, overloads, and cyberattacks. These systems must maintain robustness in the presence of adaptations that are not centrally controlled or authorized.

Managing traditional qualities such as security, performance, reliability, and usability is necessary but not sufficient to meet the challenges of ULS systems. This research area focuses on how to maintain quality in a ULS system in the face of continuous change, ongoing failures, and attacks. It also includes identifying, predicting, and controlling new indicators of system health.

Adaptive system infrastructure

ULS systems require an infrastructure that permits organizations in distributed locations to work in parallel to develop, select, deploy, and evolve system components. This research area investigates integrated development environments and runtime platforms that support the decentralized nature of ULS systems. This research also focuses on technologies, methods, and theories that will enable ULS systems to be developed in their deployment environments.

Behavioural emergence

ULS systems must satisfy the needs of participants at multiple levels of an organization. These participants will often behave opportunistically to meet their own objectives. Some aspects of ULS systems will be "programmed" by properly incentivizing and constraining behavior rather than by explicitly prescribing. This research area explores the use of methods and tools based on economics and game theory (for example, mechanism design) to ensure globally optimal ULS system behavior by exploiting the strategic self-interests of the system's constituencies. This research area also includes exploring metaheuristics and digital evolution to augment the cognitive limits of human designers, so they can manage ongoing ULS system adaptation more effectively.

Computational engineering

New approaches will be required to enable intellectual control at an entirely new level of scope and scale for system analysis, design, and operation. ULS systems will be defined in many languages, each with its own abstractions and semantic structures. This research area focuses on evolving the expressiveness of representations to accommodate this semantic diversity. Because the complexity of ULS systems will challenge human comprehension, this area also focuses on providing automated support for computing the behavior of components and their compositions in systems and for maintaining desired properties as ULS systems evolve.

Design

Current design theory, methods, notations, tools, practices and the acquisition methods that support them are inadequate to design ULS systems effectively. This research area broadens the traditional technology-centric definition of design to include people and organizations; social, cognitive, and economic considerations; and design structures such as design rules and government policies. It involves research in support of designing ULS systems from all of these points of view and at many levels of abstraction, from the hardware to the software to the people and organizations in which they work.

Human interaction

People are key participants in ULS systems. Many problems in complex systems today stem from failures at the individual and organizational level. Understanding ULS system behavior will depend on the view that humans are elements of a socially constituted computational process. This research involves anthropologists, sociologists, and social scientists conducting detailed socio-technical analyses of user interactions in the field, with the goal of understanding how to construct and evolve such socio-technical systems effectively.

Policy, acquisition, and management

Policy and management frameworks for ULS systems must address organizational, technical, and operational policies at all levels. Rules and policies must be developed and automated to enable fast and effective local action while preserving global capabilities. This research area focuses on transforming acquisition policies and processes to accommodate the rapid and continuous evolution of ULS systems by treating suppliers and supply chains as intrinsic and essential components of a ULS system.

=== In the United Kingdom ===
The UK's research programme in Large-scale Complex IT Systems has been concerned with issues around ULSS development and considers that an LSCITS (Large-scale complex IT system) shares many of the characteristics of a ULSS.

== See also ==
- Complex adaptive system
- Emergence
- IT portfolio management
- Self-organization
- Sociotechnical systems
- Software architecture
- Systems design
- Systems theory
