= Enterprise systems engineering =

Enterprise systems engineering (ESE) is the discipline that applies systems engineering to the design of an enterprise. As a discipline, it includes a body of knowledge, principles, and processes tailored to the design of enterprise systems.

An enterprise is a complex, socio-technical system that comprises interdependent resources of people, information, and technology that must interact to fulfill a common mission.

Enterprise systems engineering incorporates all the tasks of traditional systems engineering but is further informed by an expansive view of the political, operational, economic, and technological (POET) contexts in which the system(s) under consideration are developed, acquired, modified, maintained, or disposed.

Enterprise systems engineering may be appropriate when the complexity of the enterprise exceeds the scope of the assumptions upon which textbook systems engineering are based. Traditional systems engineering assumptions include relatively stable and well understood requirements, a system configuration that can be controlled, and a small, easily discernible set of stakeholders.

An enterprise systems engineer must produce a different kind of analysis on the people, technology, and other components of the organization in order to see the whole enterprise. As the enterprise becomes more complex, with more parameters and people involved, it is important to integrate the system as much as possible to enable the organization to achieve a higher standard.

== Elements ==
Four elements are needed for enterprise systems engineering to work. These include development through adaption, strategic technical planning, enterprise governance, and ESE processes (with stages).

=== Development through adaptation ===
Development through adaptation is a way to compromise with the problems and obstacles in complex systems. Over time, the environment changes and adaptation is required to continue development. For example, mobile phones have undergone numerous modifications since their introduction. Initially, the devices were considerably larger than those seen in later iterations. Over time, variations in size and design have been observed across different generations of mobile phones. Additionally, the evolution of mobile data technology from 1G to 5G has influenced the speed and convenience of mobile phone usage.

=== Strategic technical planning ===
Strategic technical planning (STP) gives the enterprise the picture of their aim and objectives. STP components are:

- Mission statement
- Needs assessment
- Technology descriptions and goal statement
- Hardware and software requirement
- Budget plan
- Human Resources

=== Enterprise governance ===
Enterprise governance is defined as 'the set of responsibilities and practices exercised by the board and executive management to provide strategic direction, ensure that objectives are achieved, ascertain that risks are managed appropriately and verify that the organization's resources are used responsibly,' according to CIMA Official Terminology. EG allows one to make the right decision on the choice of CEO and executives for the company, and also to identify the risks of the company.

== Processes ==
Four steps comprise the enterprise system engineering process: technology planning (TP); capabilities-based engineering analysis (CBEA); enterprise architecture (EA); and enterprise analysis and assessment (EA&A).

=== Technology planning ===
TP looks for technologies key to the enterprise. This step aims to identify the innovative ideas and choose the technologies that are useful for the enterprise.

=== Capabilities-based engineering analysis ===
CBEA is an analysis method that focuses on elements that the whole enterprise needs. The three steps are purpose formulation, exploratory analysis, and evolutionary planning:

==== Purpose formulation ====
- Assess stakeholder Interest – understand what the stakeholders want and like
- Specify outcome spaces – find solutions for several conditions and the goal for the operations
- Frame capability portfolios - collect fundamental elements

==== Exploratory analysis ====
- Assess performance and cost – identify the performance and cost in different conditions and find solutions to improve
- Explore concepts – search for new concepts and transform advanced capabilities
- Determine the need for more variety – examine the risks and chances and decide whether new ways are needed

==== Evolutionary planning ====
- Assess enterprise impacts – investigate the effects on the enterprise in technical and capability aspects
- Examine evolution strategies – explore and construct more strategies and evolution route
- Develop capability road map – plan for the capability area which includes analysis and decision making which is a tool for assessment and development for the enterprise

=== Enterprise architecture ===
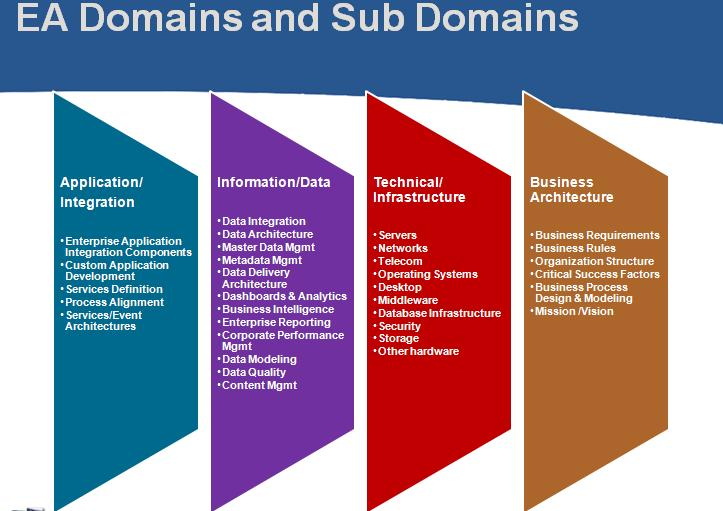
The prospective of Enterprise Architecture

EA is a model that illustrates the vision, network and framework of an organization. The four aspects (according to Michael Platt) are business prospects, application, information and technology. The diagram shows the structure of enterprise architecture. The benefits are improvement of decision making, increased IT efficiency and minimizes losses.

- Business – The strategies and processes by the operation of business
- Application – Interaction and communication along with the processes used in the company
- Information – The logical data and statistics that the organization requires to run properly and actively
- Technology – The software and hardware and different operational systems that are used in the company

All the elements are dependent and rely on each other in order to build the infrastructure.

=== Enterprise analysis and assessment ===
Enterprise analysis and assessment aims to assess whether the enterprise is going in the right direction and help to make correct decisions. Qualities required for this step include awareness of technologies, knowing and understanding command and control (C2) issues, and using modeling and simulation (M&S) explore the implications.

Activities and actions for this event include:

- Multi-scale analysis
- Early and continuous war fighter operational assessment
- Lightweight, portable M&S-based C2 capability representations
- Development software available for assessment
- Minimal infrastructure
- Flexible M&S operator-in-the-loop (OITL), and hardware-in-the-loop (HWIL) capabilities
- In-line, continuous performance monitoring and selective forensics

== Traditional systems engineering ==
Traditional systems engineering (TSE) is a term to be defined as an engineering sub-system. Elements:

- TSE is conducted by an external designer
- It is a stable system which doesn't change automatically
- Operation and development are independent of each other
- People do not play an important role in it
- Massive machines have expected conduct

A survey compared ESE and TSE. The survey reported that the two are complementary and interdependent. ESE had a higher rating while TSE could be part of ESE. The combination could be ideal.

== Applications ==
The two types of ESE application are Information Enterprise Systems Engineering and Social Enterprise Systems Engineering.

=== Information Enterprise Systems Engineering (IESE) ===
It is a system that builds up to meet the requirements and expectations of different stakeholders in the organization. There must be an input device to collect the information and output device to satisfy the information needs.

There are three different aspects for the framework of IESE:

- Functional view
- Topology view
- Physical view

Also, there are different rules for the IESE model.

- Interchangeable point of view
- Detailed views and well displayed. Showing the specific method, solution and techniques
- Consistent views
- Supported viewpoints

=== Social Enterprise System Engineering ===
This is a framework that involves planning, analyzing, mapping, and drawing a network of the process for enterprises and stakeholders. Moreover, it creates social value for entrepreneurship and explores and focuses on social and societal issues. It forms a connection between social enterprise and system engineering. There is a Social Enterprise Systems Engineering V-model, in which two or more social elements are established based on the system engineering framework—for example, more social interface analysis that reviews stakeholders' requirements, and more activities and interactions between stakeholders to exchange opinion.

== Opportunity and risk management ==
There are opportunities and risks in ESE and they have to be aggressive in seeking opportunities and also finding ways to avoid or minimize the risks. Opportunity is a trigger element that may lead to the accomplishment of objectives. Risk is a potential occurrence and will affect the performance of the entire system. There are several reasons for the importance of risk management.

1. To identify the risks before head which can prepare actions to prevent or minimize the risks
2. Since risks can cost the enterprise, determining the risk events can reduce the amount of loss
3. Help to know how to allocate the human or technology resources in order avoid the most critical risks
4. To improve organizational resilience and operational continuity during system failures or unexpected disruptions
5. To support decision-making in complex enterprise environments involving digital transformation, cloud infrastructure, cybersecurity, and emerging technologies

There are few steps in Enterprise risk and opportunity Management Process

- Prepare the risk and opportunity plan – Select team and representatives
- Identify Risks – Complete risks statements for each risk
- Identify Opportunities – People that work at tactical level and manager must understand the opportunities in order to take a further action
- Evaluate the Enterprise Risks and Opportunities – To decide which is more critical and vital
- Develop the plan – Develop after identification and evaluation with different strategies

== See also ==
- Enterprise architecture
- Enterprise engineering
- Enterprise life cycle
- Industrial engineering
- Systems engineering
- Soft systems methodology
- System of systems
- System of systems engineering (SoSE)
- Risk management plan
- Technology roadmap
