= Ian Sommerville =

Ian Som(m)erville may refer to:

- Ian Sommerville (software engineer) (born 1951), British computer scientist and author
- Ian Sommerville (technician) (1940–1976), British electronics technician and computer programmer
- Ian Somerville, an American ice dancer
