= School of Computer Science, University of Bristol =

UK academic institution

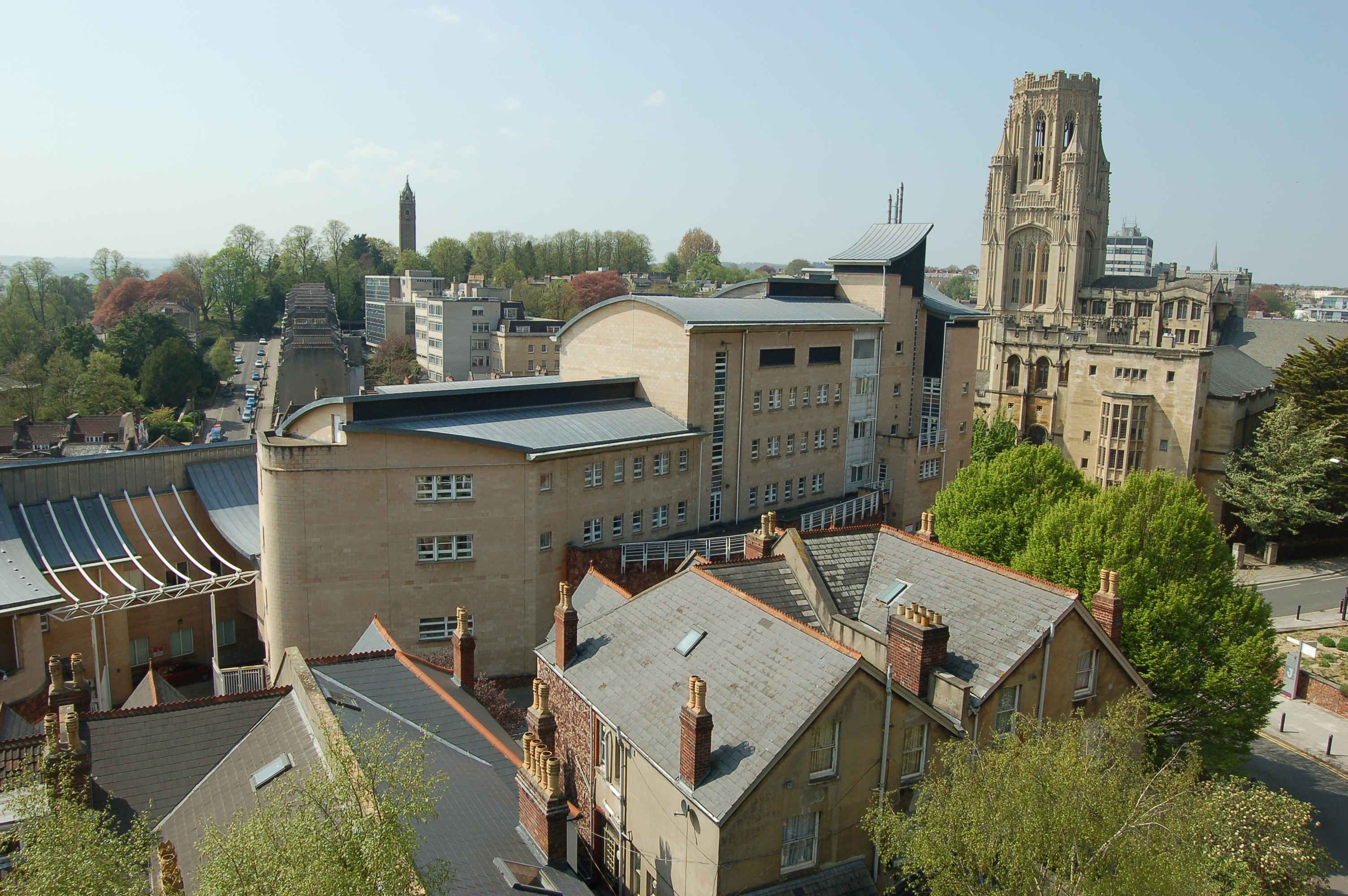
- View of the Merchant Venturers Building, home to the department of computer science, with the Wills Memorial Building in the background
- Established: 1984 (with origins in 1968)
- Head of School: Prof. Mike Fraser
- Academic staff: 62
- Location: Bristol, United Kingdom
- Campus: Clifton Campus
- Website: www.bristol.ac.uk/science-engineering/schools/computer-science/

The School of Computer Science of the University of Bristol, formerly the Department of Computer Science, is the computer science school of the University of Bristol and is based in the Merchant Venturers building on Woodland Road, close to Bristol city centre. As of 2026 the department is home to 177 academic staff, researchers, and PhD students.

== Research ==
Research in the department is organised around 10 research groups, which focus on cryptography, algorithms, Human–computer interaction (HCI), computer vision, artificial intelligence (AI), verification, computational neuroscience, cybersecurity, robotics, high-performance computing, and programming languages.

== History ==
The Department of Computer Science was formally established around 1984. Its heads of department include

1. Professor Mike Rogers (1984-1995)
2. Professor David May (1995-2006)
3. Professor Nigel Smart (2006-2008)
4. Professor Nishan Canagarajah (2008- ?)
5. Dr Neill Campbell (?-2011)
6. Dr Ian Holyer (2011-?)
7. Professor Andrew Calway (?-2016)
8. Professor Seth Bullock (2016-2020)
9. Professor Christian Allen (2020-2021)
10. Dr. Aisling O'Kane (2021-)

== Notable faculty members ==
As of 2021 the department employs fourteen Professors, shown below:

1. Professor Awais Rashid
2. Professor Dave Cliff
3. Professor Peter Flach
4. Professor Majid Mirmehdi
5. Professor Seth Bullock
6. Professor Kerstin Eder
7. Professor Walterio Mayol-Cuevas
8. Professor Simon McIntosh-Smith
9. Professor Andrew Calway
10. Professor Kirsten Cater
11. Professor Ian Nabney
12. Professor Chris Preist
13. Professor Bogdan Warinschi
14. Professor Dima Damen
