= Doctor of Sustainability =

Doctor of Sustainability (Latin: doctor rerum sustinentium, lit. 'doctor of sustainability'), abbreviated Dr. rer. sust. or DSus is a transdisciplinary doctoral academic degree awarded in the field of sustainability science. Like other doctorate degrees, it is the highest academic qualification in the field and equivalent to a PhD.

== Motivation ==
The introduction of this doctoral degree was partly due to the demand that science and research make a greater contribution to solving social problems and to produce knowledge that is "socially robust". The main idea is to depart from the understanding of science being a compartmentalized preoccupation with academic problems to an interdisciplinary and transdisciplinary process of knowledge genesis in a network of scientists and relevant stakeholders.

Sustainability sciences address the complex interplay between society and the environment in an attempt to provide new insights into existing challenges while opening up new forays of knowledge. Research in sustainability science focuses on issues relating to sustainability and sustainable development. A characteristic of dissertations in this field are the practical nature of the problems they address without being strictly restricted to employing theories and methods from any specific discipline. The overarching principle of sustainability measurement is often used as a framework for scientific analysis.

== History and Development ==
The first approval for conferment of this degree was granted on March 27, 2019, to Darmstadt University of Applied Sciences by the Hessian Minister of Science Angela Dorn. This was after the federal state of Hesse passed a law that made it possible for its universities of applied sciences to apply for independent rights to award doctoral degrees in research-intensive disciplines.

As of 2020, Curtin University in Perth Australia offers a similar degree albeit as Doctor of Sustainable Development. At Curtin University, the doctoral candidates must complete course work equivalent to 100 credit points before embarking on their doctoral thesis.

The Arizona State University offers a Doctor of Philosophy degree in sustainability. Students can be admitted to the PhD program with either a bachelor's or a master's degree from an international institution with recognized and accredited degrees. The course work requirements vary based on the candidates prior qualifications and highest academic degree. The dissertation phase only begins after successfully completing the coursework. A proposal must be submitted and defended before the dissertation research work can be conducted. The doctoral degree program concludes with the publication of the dissertation accompanied by a dissertation defense.

As of 2023, the United Nations University offers a PhD programme in Sustainability Science. This is a three-year programme that aims to produce scholars who will become key researchers in the field of sustainability science. The program seeks to promote a better understanding on matters sustainability by incorporating global change perspectives, specifically those related to climate change and biodiversity. The entry requirements include having a masters degree in a field related to sustainability and a minimum of 2 years of professional field experience related to sustainability. Students can select courses from those offered by UNU-IAS, while also enjoying the opportunity to take courses at other leading universities in Japan such as the University of Tokyo, Sophia University, and International Christian University. Like in most other places, the PhD degree concludes with a dissertation.

The University of Surrey offers a Practitioner Doctorate in Sustainability. The degree is designed to allow students to pursue research studies at doctoral level while gaining invaluable research experience in a prestigious organisation external to the University. The programme is aimed at high-achieving researchers and graduates whose vision is to become a sustainability leader in industry. A series of sustainability modules and personal development workshops among four specified taught modules must be completed. The final assessment is based on the presentation of the doctoral thesis, which is discussed during a viva examination with at least two examiners. The dissertation can be submitted as a monograph or as a cumulative of several publication format chapters.

The University of the Philippines Open University similarly offers a practitioner-oriented and research-intensive Doctor in Sustainability (DSus) degree through its Faculty of Management and Development Studies. The DSus degree addresses the felt need for professionals to undertake advanced academic training and develop transformative research approaches based on practical issues. Core courses include worldviews of sustainability, complex sustainable systems, education for sustainable development, managing sustainability transitions, and communicating sustainability. Sustainability is drawn from three pillars: environmental, socio-political and economic. Graduates are expected to be able to apply innovative solutions that can contribute to a transition of societal, institutional and regulatory structures towards sustainability.

== See also ==
- Doctor of Engineering
- Doctor of Business Administration
- Doctor of Science
- Doctor of Philosophy
