= Doctor of Technology =

Advanced level engineering degree

The Doctor of Technology, or Doctor of Engineering Sciences, or Doctor of Technical Sciences, or Doctor of Science (abbreviated and translated variously in different countries) is a degree normally conferred upon candidates after having completed a course of study in technology and a dissertation or a project of lengthy duration in a technologically related field. Like other doctorates, it is usually an academic degree at the highest level equivalent to a PhD.

While the details of the degree vary, a doctor of technology program usually enables graduates to obtain an advanced level of knowledge in specialist fields and aims to produce graduates capable of advancing knowledge within their industry. The degree focuses on developing practical solutions in the workplace, critical analysis, synthesis, and innovation.

== As a substantive degree ==
In Austria, universities of technology, such as TU Wien and TU Graz, grant the title of "Dr. techn." (in German: "Doktor der technischen Wissenschaften" which translates to Doctor of Engineering Sciences, or Doctor of Science, or Doctor of Technical Sciences), also rendered as "Doctor technicae" (Dr.techn.), as equivalent to the PhD. A similar title, also designated "Dr.techn." (Doctor technicae), is awarded in Denmark (e.g., DTU).

In Sweden the situation is the same and the degrees are called teknologie doktor or teknisk doktor ("Tekn. Dr." or "Tek. Dr.") and are translated to PhD in English. In Finland, the degree tekniikan tohtori (TkT) or teknologie doktor (Doctor of Science (Technology), D.Sc. (Tech.)) is comparable to a Finnish filosofian tohtori (Doctor of Philosophy).

In South Africa, the Doctor of Technology or Doctor Technologiae (DTech) is equivalent to other research doctorates at level 10 of the South African National Qualifications Framework. It is normally awarded by universities of technology and can be awarded in a wide variety of fields, not just technology.

In the United States, Purdue University offers the Doctor of Technology (DTech) as an equivalent to the Ph.D. through the Purdue Polytechnic Institute with the key differentiator being the DTech requires a dissertation focusing on applied/use-inspired research of direct relevance to professional practice. Additionally, the Doctor of Industrial Technology (D.I.T.) degree was recognized by the National Science Foundation (NSF) as equivalent to the PhD degree until 2008, when it was determined that it had moved to a more professional orientation and no longer met the NSF criteria for a research doctorate.

== Higher doctorates ==
In the United Kingdom the degree of Doctor of Technology (DTech) is offered as a higher doctorate by a number of universities.

== See also ==
- Doktoringenieur
- Doctor of Engineering
- Doctor of Sustainability
- Dr. rer. nat.
