= System of systems engineering =

System-of-Systems Engineering (SoSE) is a set of developing processes, tools, and methods for designing, re-designing and deploying solutions to System-of-Systems challenges.

== Overview ==
System of Systems Engineering (SoSE) methodology is heavily used in U.S. Department of Defense applications, but is increasingly being applied to non-defense related problems such as architectural design of problems in air and auto transportation, healthcare, global communication networks, search and rescue, space exploration and many other System of Systems application domains. SoSE is more than systems engineering of monolithic, complex systems because design for System-of-Systems problems is performed under some level of uncertainty in the requirements and the constituent systems, and it involves considerations in multiple levels and domains (as per and). Whereas systems engineering focuses on building the system right, SoSE focuses on choosing the right system(s) and their interactions to satisfy the requirements.

System-of-Systems Engineering and Systems Engineering are related but different fields of study. Whereas systems engineering addresses the development and operations of monolithic products, SoSE addresses the development and operations of evolving programs. In other words, traditional systems engineering seeks to optimize an individual system (i.e., the product), while SoSE seeks to optimize network of various interacting legacy and new systems brought together to satisfy multiple objectives of the program. SoSE should enable the decision-makers to understand the implications of various choices on technical performance, costs, extensibility and flexibility over time; thus, effective SoSE methodology should prepare decision-makers to design informed architectural solutions for System-of-Systems problems.

Due to varied methodology and domains of applications in existing literature, there does not exist a single unified consensus for processes involved in System-of-Systems Engineering. One of the proposed SoSE frameworks, by Dr. Daniel A. DeLaurentis, recommends a three-phase method where a SoS problem is defined (understood), abstracted, modeled and analyzed for behavioral patterns. More information on this method and other proposed methods can be found in the listed SoSE focused organizations and SoSE literature in the subsequent sections.

== See also ==
- Enterprise systems engineering
- System of systems
- Enterprise architecture
