= King Alfred's Academy =

King Alfred's

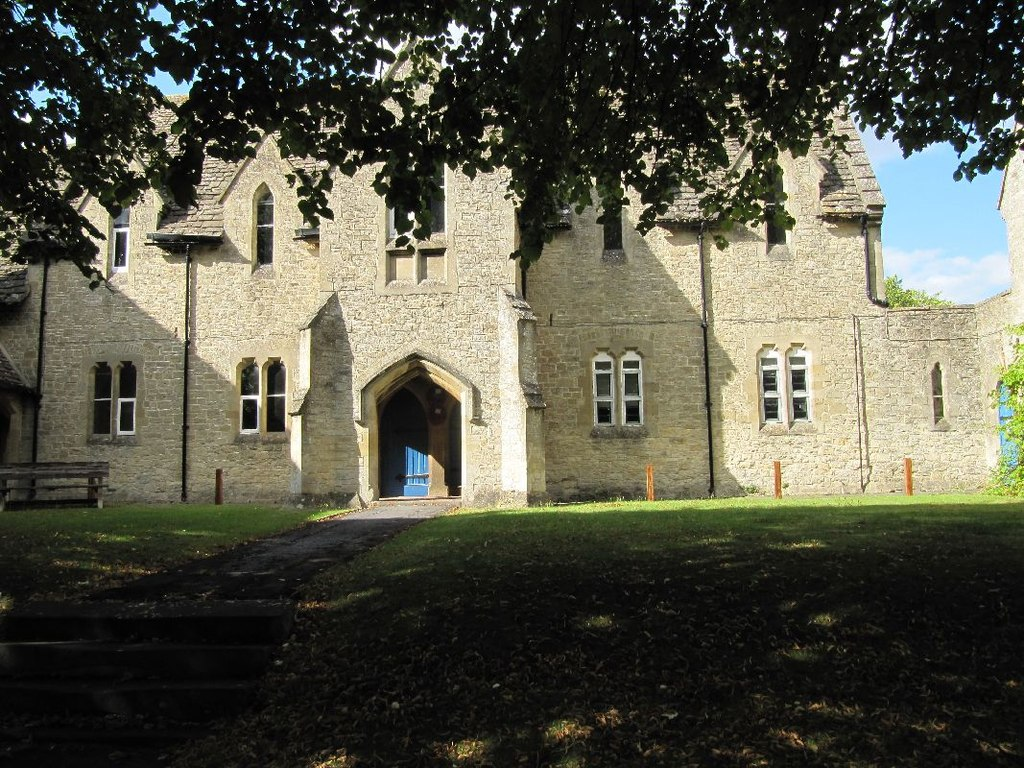
- King Alfred's Centre Site

Location
- Wantage, Oxfordshire, OX12 9BY; England
- Coordinates: 51°35′12″N 1°25′46″W

Information
- Type: Comprehensive; Academy
- Motto: Achieving Excellence Together
- Established: 1597
- Local authority: Oxfordshire
- Specialist: Sports
- Department for Education URN: 137140 Tables
- Ofsted: Reports
- Head teacher: Jonathan Smart
- Gender: Co-educational
- Age: 11 to 18
- Enrolment: 1,805
- Houses: Ridgeway, Vale, White Horse
- Colours: Sky blue, navy blue and black (Ridgeway=Red, Vale=Blue, White Horse=Yellow)
- Website: www.kaacademy.org

King Alfred's Academy is a comprehensive co-educational secondary school in Wantage, Oxfordshire, administered as an academy. It is named after King Alfred the Great, who ruled Wessex from 871 to 899 and was born in Wantage in 849 AD. The school has approximately 140 teachers and 1,800 pupils spread across two sites.

== History ==
The earliest phase of the school was created by letters patent of Queen Elizabeth I in 1597 (429 years ago). Properties given for charitable purposes in the reigns of Henry VI and Henry VII were applied for the relief of the poor, road maintenance and the funding of a schoolmaster to teach grammar. The original school was built in the churchyard moving to a new site and adopting the name 'King Alfred' in 1849, the millenary of the latter's birth.

The school amalgamated with Icknield (now East Site) and Segsbury (now West Site) during the 1980s.

The three schools (Segsbury Secondary Modern, Icknield Comprehensive and King Alfred's Grammar School) were broadly independent from each other, with some links from 1972. They merged to become Wantage School (Segsbury, Icknield, and King Alfred's Halls) for the 1984/5 academic term. For the 1987/8 term and beyond, the whole entity was renamed King Alfred's School to retain the former's history.

The Sixth Form was built in the late 1970s next door to Centre Site.

The School became a Specialist Sports College in the late 1990s. For most of the 2000s the school was known as King Alfred's Community and Sports College.

In September 2011 King Alfred's was designated an Academy and retained sports college status.

On 25 April 2014 King Alfred's was visited by Prince Edward, Earl of Wessex and his wife Sophie, Countess of Wessex to open the new hall block at Centre Site.

Alumni include: computer scientist Professor Dave Cliff; spy novelist John Gardner; actor/author Stephen North; jockey Lester Piggott; neuroscientist Professor Anil Seth; Anna Yearley OBE, Executive Director of human-rights nonprofit Reprieve; Erin Kennedy MBE, paralympic coxswain; Christopher Ricks literary critic and scholar and Thomas Skurray managing director of Morlands (1890 - 1938).

== Sites ==
The school is distributed over two sites, corresponding to the age groups catered for.

=== East Site ===
East Site, formerly Icknield School, catered for Year 7 and Year 8 students. In 2012, £661,000 was spent on improvements to the facilities including new classroom a new science lab, new music rooms and a new fitness suite. In all, East Site had more than 25 classrooms, including 4 science labs, 4 ICT rooms, a drama studio, a tennis court, a netball court, a library and 5 rooms devoted to design and technology.

On 13 April 2016, the academy was granted planning permission by the local district council to demolish East Site and to build 150 new homes on the site whereby the academy plans on selling the site to Bovis Homes (now Vistry Homes). Doing this enables the academy to move to two site operation whereby the money raised from selling East Site will enable to academy to expand and refurbish West Site, Centre Site and the Sixth Form. The site was finally closed in 2017 as the three sites were condensed into two, and the school buildings have since been demolished.

=== West Site ===
West Site, formerly Segsbury School, is the site attended by approximately 620 Year 7 and Year 8 students. It has more than 20 classrooms including 6 science labs, 3 ICT rooms, a dance/drama studio, newly refurbished kitchen and sports hall. It does have a library. After the closure of East Site, many of the newly developed buildings from 2012 were moved to West Site and are now used as the humanities department. As another part of the refurbishment the main office was moved, the canteen and the toilets improved. Along with the repainting of the English classrooms and corridors.

=== Centre Site and Sixth Form ===
Centre Site, formerly King Alfred's School, is the site attended by Year 9 students, Year 10 students and Year 11 students - those in the last year of Compulsory education in Great Britain. It has more than 55 classrooms, 16 of which are situated in a four storey block, which includes science labs and ICT rooms. There is also a Macbook suite. It has no onsite sports facilities, but is able to make use of the local leisure centre, which was built on the site of the former school playing fields.

The Sixth Form, used by students aged between 16 and 18, and located across the road from Centre Site, was opened in the 1970s. It also makes use both of the Centre Site facilities and those of the local leisure centre, the latter offering students access to sports activities and a dance studio. The sixth form was awarded 'Outstanding' by Ofsted in 2018.

Centre Site has had several recent developments with the opening of an upgraded hall and a rebuilt canteen and classroom block. On 25 April 2014, the Earl and Countess of Wessex visited the school to open the new hall block. On 4 December 2015, Wantage MP, Ed Vaizey officially opened the new canteen and teaching block which includes a new 250 seat restaurant, a café and several teaching classrooms.

A new science block at Centre Site was completed in January 2018. The new science building, built on the site of the previous drama and music block, helped with the move from three to two sites and also modernised the previous science facilities. Replacing the previous science block at Centre Site, which had only six laboratories. The new building contains ten laboratories and nine additional classrooms.

== Notable alumni ==
- Michael Farmer, Baron Farmer (born 1944), businessman and life peer in the House of Lords
- John Gardner, writer
- Anil Seth (born 1972), neuroscientist and professor

== See also ==
- List of English and Welsh endowed schools (19th century)
