= Construction by configuration =

Construction by Configuration (CbC) is a process defined by Ian Sommerville in 2008 for the adoption of a Commercial off-the-shelf systems (COTS) in an organization. This can range from simple parameter setting through the definition of business rules to special purpose components development.

According to Sommerville, many companies and government organizations have changed their strategy from "specify and develop" to "buy and configure." Thus, generic systems are purchased and configured to create a specific version applied to an organization context by adapting modules to structures, business lines and processes.

In his work, Sommerville identified three (3) types of configurable systems: single PC-based applications with built-in, modular generic systems (such as ERP systems) and COTS assemblies. He determined that the most complex and risky to configure are the COTS, and indicated that regardless of the facilities that this software category provides, a set of activities that are common in the configuration process should be managed to address avoid the mostly failures reported. These are:

1. System selection.
2. Requirements analysis.
3. Business process redesign.
4. System configuration.
5. System testing.
6. Deployment and evolution.
