= Doctor of Public Administration =

Advanced academic degree

The Doctor of Public Administration (D.P.A.) is a terminal applied-research doctoral degree in the field of public administration (a part of public service). The D.P.A. requires significant coursework beyond the masters level and a dissertation that contributes to theory or practice. Upon successful completion, the title of "Doctor" is awarded and the post-nominal letters of D.P.A. or DPA can be used.

== Overview ==
Like a Ph.D., a D.P.A. is normally a terminal research degree. The U.S. Department of Education and the U.S. National Science Foundation (NSF) recognize the D.P.A. as an academically equivalent degree to the more common Ph.D. and they do not discriminate between the two degrees.

In many cases, D.P.A. programs are identical to Ph.D. programs. Additionally, the D.P.A. dissertation is usually at the same level as a Ph.D. in terms of effort, rigor, contribution to knowledge, supervision and assessment. A study published by the National Association of Schools of Public Affairs and Administration titled What's in a Name? Comparing DPA and Ph.D. Programs concluded that there were "few differences between the programs, noting that degree title is more informative about the type of students recruited than outputs"

D.P.A. research is both theoretical and practical, but the research focus of the typical D.P.A. addresses applied issues, with the results providing professional outcomes that are of direct relevance to practice. While also intended to prepare graduates for academic careers, the D.P.A., by virtue of its focus on application of theory, has more practical application in managerial settings than the Ph.D. degree. Most D.P.A. graduates lead careers as senior-level practitioners, while others enter academia. This is similar to other professional research doctorates such as the Doctor of Business Administration (DBA) and Doctor of Education (Ed.D.).

A Ph.D. is more concentrated on developing theory and conducting specialized scholarly research. This degree is more appropriate for people who wish to become professional researchers, or who wish to pursue a career in academia. Most Ph.D. graduates lead careers as university researchers and professors or as senior researchers in business or government.

== Purpose ==
The Doctor of Public Administration program is designed to provide senior-level public managers, or quasi-public managers, with the substantive skills, knowledge and values necessary in this area. Students in most programs develop a thorough knowledge of the legal, ethical and political environments of public administrators. Students understand the administrative functions of governmental agencies and gain expertise in strategic planning, advanced management techniques, program implementation and results-based leadership.

The official policy of Network of Schools of Public Policy, Affairs, and Administration (NASPAA) is that the doctorate is a research degree, regardless of degree title. Its "Policy on Doctoral Education in Public Affairs/Public Administration" (1983,1987,1) states that: "Doctoral programs in public administration...should prepare students to undertake significant research in their subsequent careers, whether in government, academic life, or other settings; the capacity to do significant research, rather than access to a particular career setting, is the appropriate goal of doctoral training."

== Structure of programs ==
Most D.P.A. programs require about 90 credit hours of combined graduate coursework. Students are expected to take a number of core classes, electives, research/method classes, and dissertation credits. Some programs also require comprehensive examinations. All programs require a doctoral dissertation that contributes to knowledge. Candidates typically work with a committee and advisors throughout the process and the dissertation eventually requires an oral defense to the student's committee. Curricula may be offered on a full-time or part-time basis. The normal duration of a doctorate should correspond to 3–5 years of full-time graduate study or 7–10 years of sustained part-time graduate study.

The D.P.A. is preceded by a master's degree, typically the Master of Public Administration or the Master of Public Policy. D.P.A. programs are most common in the United States and the Philippines. The D.P.A. degree may have a specialization such as management science, organizational behavior, implementation, non-profit management, public finance, national security, defense policy, education policy, environmental policy, international trade and immigration, policy making, policy evaluation, program evaluation, criminal justice, civil rights, health and welfare, federalism, strategic management, public health, administrative law, social welfare, tax policy, government-business relations, economic policy, and public management.

== See also ==
- List of fields of doctoral studies in the United States § Social sciences
