= Risk management plan =

Multi-dimensionable matrix method for mitigating risks

A risk management plan is a document to foresee risks, estimate impacts, and define responses to risks. It also contains a risk assessment matrix. According to the Project Management Institute, a risk management plan is a "component of the project, program, or portfolio management plan that describes how risk management activities will be structured and performed".

Moreover, according to the Project Management Institute, a risk is "an uncertain event or condition that, if it occurs, has a positive or negative effect on a project's objectives". Risk is inherent with any project, and project managers should assess risks continually and develop plans to address them. The risk management plan contains an analysis of likely risks with both high and low impact, as well as mitigation strategies to help the project avoid being derailed should common problems arise. Risk management plans should be periodically reviewed by the project team to avoid having the analysis become stale and not reflective of actual potential project risks.

== Risk response ==
Broadly, there are four potential responses to risk with numerous variations on the specific terms used to name these response options:

- Avoid – Change plans to circumvent the problem;
- Control / mitigate / modify / reduce – Reduce threat impact or likelihood (or both) through intermediate steps;
- Accept / retain – Assume the chance of the negative impact (or auto-insurance), eventually budget the cost (e.g. via a contingency budget line); or
- Transfer / share – Outsource risk (or a portion of the risk) to a third party or parties that can manage the outcome. This is done financially through insurance contracts or hedging transactions, or operationally through outsourcing an activity.

(Mnemonic: SARA, for Share Avoid Reduce Accept, or A-CAT, for "Avoid, Control, Accept, or Transfer")

Risk management plans often include matrices.

== Examples ==
The United States Department of Defense, as part of acquisition, uses risk management planning that may have a Risk Management Plan document for the specific project. The general intent of the RMP in this context is to define the scope of risks to be tracked and means of documenting reports. It is also desired that there would be an integrated relationship to other processes. An example of this would be explaining which developmental tests verify risks of the design type were minimized are stated as part of the test and evaluation master plan. A further example would be instructions from 5000.2D that for programs that are part of a system of systems the risk management strategy shall specifically address integration and interoperability as a risk area. The RMP specific process and templates shift over time (e.g. the disappearance of 2002 documents Defense Finance and Accounting Service / System Risk Management Plan, and the SPAWAR Risk Management Process).

== See also ==
- Event chain methodology
- Project management
- Project Management Professional
- Risk Evaluation and Mitigation Strategies (REMS)
- Risk management
- Risk management tools
- Risk management framework
- Gordon–Loeb model for cyber security investments
