= Peter Flach =

Dutch computer scientist and a Professor of Artificial Intelligence (born 1961)

- Born: Pieter Adriaan Flach; 8 April 1961 (age 65); Sneek, Netherlands
- Scientific career
- Workplaces: University of Bristol
- Website: www.cs.bris.ac.uk/~flach

Pieter "Peter" Adriaan Flach (born 8 April 1961, Sneek) is a Dutch computer scientist and a Professor of Artificial Intelligence in the Department of Computer Science at the University of Bristol. He is author of the acclaimed Simply Logical: Intelligent Reasoning by Example (John Wiley, 1994) and Machine Learning: the Art and Science of Algorithms that Make Sense of Data (Cambridge University Press, 2012).

== Education ==
Flach received an MSc Electrical Engineering from Universiteit Twente in 1987 and a PhD in Computer Science from Tilburg University in 1995.

== Research ==
Flach's research interests are in data mining and machine learning.
