= Dave Cliff (computer scientist) =

British computer scientist

Dave Cliff FRSA FIMA FBCS CITP
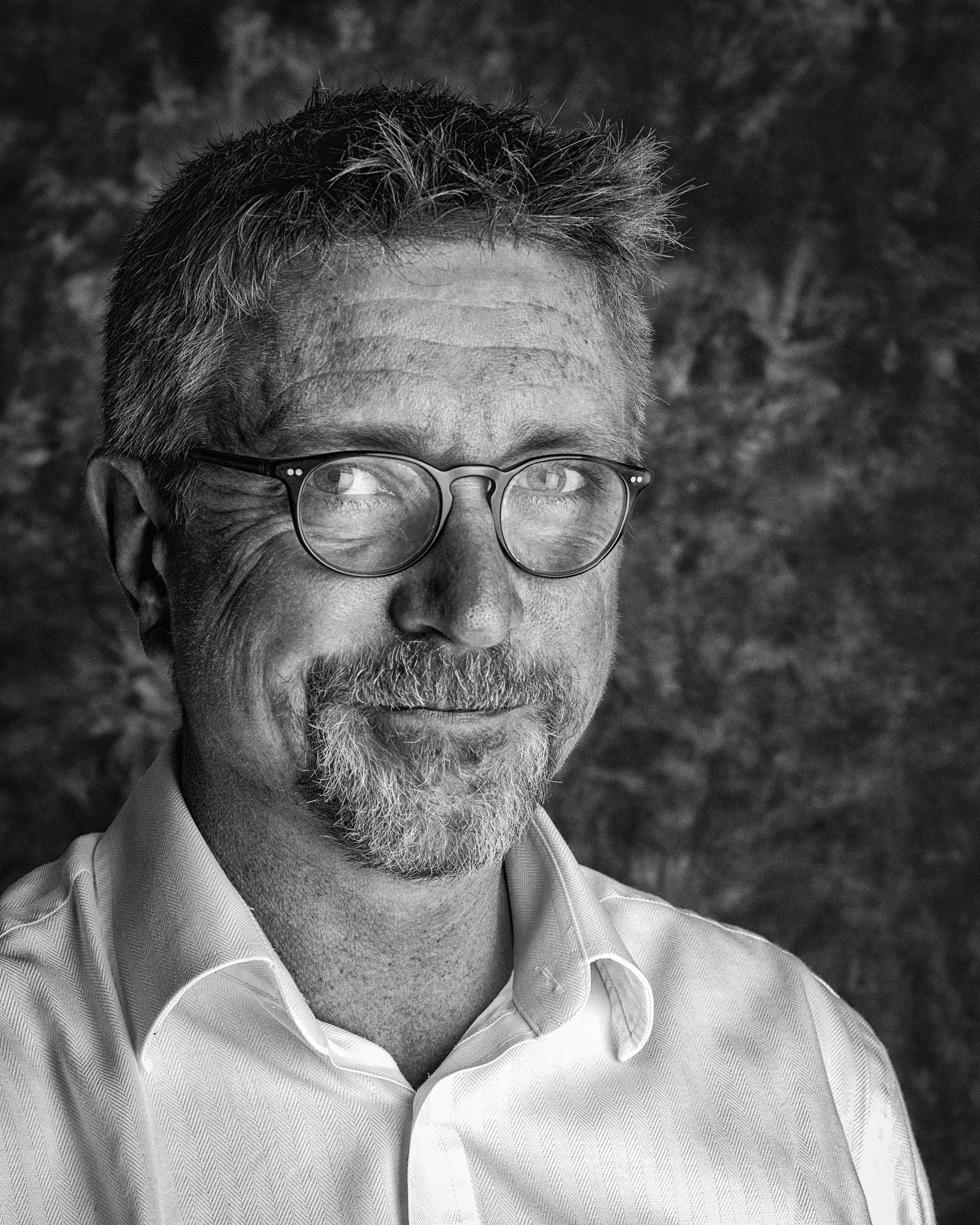
- Dave Cliff in 2015
- Born: David T. Cliff; 1966 (age 59–60)
- Education: Segsbury School; University of Leeds (BSc); University of Sussex (MSc, PhD)
- Scientific career
- Fields: Complex Adaptive Systems; Markets; Financial systems Auctions
- Workplaces: University of Leeds; University of Sussex; Hewlett-Packard; Deutsche Bank; MIT CSAIL; University of Southampton; University of Bristol
- Thesis: Animate vision in an artificial fly: a study in computational neuroethology (1992)
- Website: research-information.bris.ac.uk/en/persons/be355d7e-e5a7-458d-8fb8-daf6c64e9dbd

David T. Cliff FRSA FIMA FBCS CITP (born 1966) is an Emeritus Professor in the School of Computer Science at the University of Bristol and was formerly the Director of the UK Large-scale Complex IT Systems (LSCITS) Initiative. Cliff is the inventor of the seminal "ZIP" trading algorithm, one of the first of the current generation of autonomous adaptive algorithmic trading systems, which was demonstrated to outperform human traders in research published in 2001 by IBM. He is also the inventor on multiple international patents from the early 2000s concerning his invention hpDJ, the world's first fully automated disk-jockey (DJ) system for electronic dance music, the precursor to present-day DJ automation tools such as Traktor.

== Education ==
Cliff was educated Segsbury School, a state school in Wantage. Cliff has a Bachelor of Science degree in Computer Science from the University of Leeds, with Master of Science and PhD degrees in Cognitive Science from the University of Sussex.

== Career and research ==
Cliff spent the first seven years of his career working as an academic, initially at the University of Sussex UK and then as an associate professor in the MIT Computer Science and Artificial Intelligence Laboratory, Cambridge USA. Cliff's early research was in computational neuroscience/neuroethology studying visual control of gaze and flight in airborne insects; in using artificial evolution to automate the design of autonomous mobile robots; and in studying the coadaptive dynamics of competitive co-evolutionary arms-races (e.g. between species of predator and prey).

In 1996, while working as a consultant for Hewlett Packard Labs, Cliff invented the "ZIP" trading algorithm. In 1998 he resigned his post at MIT to take up a job as a senior research scientist at the HP Labs European Research Centre in Bristol, UK, where he founded and led HP's Complex Adaptive Systems research group.

In 1999, Cliff (who described himself in a 2001 press interview as "a very bad amateur DJ") invented hpDJ, the world's first fully automated DJ system for electronic dance music (EDM), which automatically generated a serial play-order for a set of EDM tracks, and then did automated beat-detection, time-stretching/compression, and phase-alignment to create "seamless" continuous beat-matched mixes from one track into another. In this sense, hpDJ was the precursor to present-day DJ beat-matching mix automation tools such as those found in Traktor. The hpDJ project was the subject of multiple international patents invented or co-invented by Cliff over 2001–2005, and included patents for a wrist-mounted device which monitored the wearer's biosignals such as heart-rate and perspiration, and included movement and location sensors: the intention was that these devices would be worn by members of the hpDJ's audience to provide feedback to hpDJ on how the audience was responding to the music being played.

In early 2005, Cliff moved to Deutsche Bank's Foreign Exchange trading floor in London, where he worked as a director in Deutsche's FX Complex Risk Group. In late 2005, Cliff resigned from Deutsche to serve as a professor of Computer Science at the University of Southampton. In October 2005 Cliff was appointed Director of a UK national research consortium, addressing issues in the science and engineering of Large-scale Complex IT Systems (LSCITS): this £14m ($28m) research project involved approximately 250 person-years of effort over the years 2007–2014. In July 2007, Cliff moved to become Professor of Computer Science at the University of Bristol.

The LSCITS Initiative shared much with the research effort in the USA directed at Ultra-Large-Scale Systems (ULSS). In 2011, Cliff and Linda Northrop (Director of the USA's Software Engineering Institute's ULSS Project) jointly authored a paper on the global financial markets as ultra-large-scale systems, commissioned by the UK Government Office for Science.

From 2010 to 2012 Cliff was a member of the 8-person core Lead Expert Group (LEG) which led the UK Government's Government Office for Science two-year investigation into The Future of Computer Trading in Financial Markets. In addition to Cliff, the other members of the LEG were Philip Bond, Clara Furse, Charles Goodhart, Andy Haldane, Kevin Houstoun, Oliver Linton, and Jean-Pierre Zigrand, co-director of the Systemic Risk Centre. The investigation commissioned large volumes of peer-reviewed research from international experts, all of which was published by the Government Office for Science and which is summarised in the project's extensive final report.

Cliff is a regular presenter on the stage-show GCSE Science Live where large audiences (typically more than 1,000) of schoolchildren in years 10-11 watch presentations from well-known scientists. Other scientists involved in GCSE Science Live shows include Maggie Aderin-Pocock, Jim Al-Khalili, Richard Dawkins, Ben Goldacre, Steve Jones, Sir David King, Simon Singh and Lord Winston.

In December 2013 Cliff presented a one-off TV documentary on BBC Four titled The Joy of Logic. The programme explored the human quest for certainty and sound reasoning, and the development of logical machines and computers. In April 2015 The Joy of Logic won the top prize - Best International Film - at Europe's leading Science Film Festival, Academia Film Olomouc. It had previously been nominated for international documentary film/TV awards including a "Rockie" at the Banff World Media Festival and a Grierson Award in the UK (losing to Educating Yorkshire).
