= List of fields of doctoral studies in the United States =

This is the list of the fields of doctoral studies in the United States used for the annual Survey of Earned Doctorates, conducted by NORC at the University of Chicago for the National Science Foundation and other federal agencies, as used for the 2015 survey.

These are fields of research-oriented doctoral studies, leading mostly to Ph.D.s – in the academic year 2014–15, 98% of the 55,006 research doctorates awarded in the U.S. were Ph.D.s; 1.1% were Ed.D.s; 0.9% were other research doctorates. Professional degrees, though they are also considered doctorates (earned, not honorary), and do entitle the holder to call themselves "Doctor", such as D.D.S., D.M.D.,D.Min., M.D., D.Pharm., D.V.M, J.D., Psy.D., and Th.D., are not included in the survey.

== Life sciences ==
=== Agricultural sciences/natural resources ===
- 000 Agricultural Economics
- 003 Natural Resource/Environmental Economics (also in social sciences)
- 010 Animal Nutrition
- 014 Animal Science, Poultry (or Avian)
- 019 Animal Science, Other
- 020 Agronomy and Crop Science
- 025 Agricultural and Horticultural Plant Breeding
- 030 Plant Pathology/Phytopathology (also in biological/biomedical sciences)
- 039 Plant Sciences, Other
- 043 Food Science
- 044 Food Science and Technology, Other
- 046 Soil Chemistry/Microbiology
- 049 Soil Sciences, Other
- 050 Horticulture Science
- 055 Fishing and Fisheries Sciences/Management
- 066 Forest Sciences and Biology
- 070 Forest/Resources Management
- 072 Wood Science and Pulp/Paper Technology
- 074 Natural Resources/Conservation
- 079 Forestry and Related Science, Other
- 080 Wildlife/Range Management
- 081 Environmental Science
- 098 Agricultural Sciences/Natural Resources, General
- 099 Agricultural Sciences/Natural Resources, Other

=== Biological/biomedical sciences ===
- 100 Biochemistry (see also #539)
- 102 Bioinformatics
- 103 Biomedical Sciences
- 104 Computational Biology
- 105 Biophysics (also in physics)
- 107 Biotechnology
- 110 Bacteriology
- 115 Plant Genetics
- 120 Plant Pathology/Phytopathology (also in agricultural sciences)
- 125 Plant Physiology
- 129 Botany/Plant Biology
- 130 Anatomy
- 133 Biometrics and Biostatistics
- 134 Epidemiology
- 136 Cell/Cellular Biology and Histology
- 137 Evolutionary Biology
- 139 Ecology
- 142 Developmental Biology/Embryology
- 145 Endocrinology
- 148 Entomology
- 151 Immunology
- 152 Marine Biology and Biological Oceanography
- 154 Molecular Biology
- 155 Structural Biology
- 157 Microbiology
- 158 Cancer Biology
- 160 Neuroscience
- 163 Nutrition science
- 166 Parasitology
- 167 Environmental Toxicology
- 168 Virology
- 169 Toxicology
- 170 Genetics/Genomics, Human and Animal
- 175 Pathology, Human and Animal
- 180 Pharmacology, Human and Animal
- 185 Physiology, Human and Animal
- 188 Wildlife Biology
- 189 Zoology
- 198 Biology/Biomedical Sciences, General
- 199 Biology/Biomedical Sciences, Other

=== Health sciences ===
- 200 Speech-Language Pathology and Audiology
- 207 Oral Biology/Oral Pathology
- 210 Environmental Health
- 212 Health Systems/Service Administration
- 215 Public Health
- 217 Health Policy Analysis
- 222 Kinesiology/Exercise Science
- 227 Gerontology (also in social sciences)
- 230 Nursing Science
- 240 Pharmaceutical Sciences
- 245 Rehabilitation/Therapeutic Services
- 250 Veterinary Sciences
- 280 Health and Behavior
- 298 Health Sciences, General
- 299 Health Sciences, Other

== Engineering ==
- 300 Aerospace, Aeronautical & Astronautical Engineering
- 303 Agricultural Engineering
- 306 Bioengineering and Biomedical Engineering
- 312 Chemical Engineering
- 315 Civil Engineering
- 316 Structural Engineering
- 318 Communications Engineering
- 321 Computer Engineering
- 324 Electrical, Electronics and Communications Engineering
- 327 Engineering Mechanics
- 330 Engineering Physics
- 333 Engineering Science
- 336 Environmental/Environmental Health Engineering
- 337 Geotechnical and Geoenvironmental Engineering
- 339 Industrial and Manufacturing Engineering
- 342 Materials Science
- 345 Mechanical Engineering
- 348 Metallurgical Engineering
- 357 Nuclear Engineering
- 360 Ocean Engineering
- 363 Operations Research (also in mathematics and in business management)
- 366 Petroleum Engineering
- 369 Polymer & Plastics Engineering
- 372 Systems Engineering
- 373 Transportation and Highway Engineering
- 376 Engineering Management and Administration
- 398 Engineering, General
- 399 Engineering, Other

== Computer and information sciences ==
- 400 Computer Science
- 410 Information Science and Systems
- 415 Robotics
- 418 Computer and Information sciences, General
- 419 Computer and Information sciences, Other

== Mathematics ==
- 420 Applied Mathematics
- 425 Algebra
- 430 Analysis & Functional Analysis
- 435 Geometry/Geometric Analysis
- 440 Logic
- 445 Number Theory
- 450 Statistics (also in social sciences)
- 455 Topology, Foundations
- 460 Computing Theory and Practice
- 465 Operations Research (also in engineering and in business management)
- 498 Mathematics/Statistics, General
- 499 Mathematics/Statistics, Other

== Physical sciences ==
=== Astronomy ===
- 500 Astronomy
- 505 Astrophysics
- 509 Astronomy, Other
- 511 Astrobiology

=== Atmospheric science and meteorology ===
- 510 Atmospheric Chemistry and Climatology
- 512 Atmospheric Physics and Dynamics
- 514 Meteorology
- 518 Atmospheric Science/Meteorology, General
- 519 Atmospheric Science/Meteorology, Other

=== Chemistry ===
- 520 Analytical Chemistry
- 522 Inorganic Chemistry
- 526 Organic Chemistry
- 528 Medicinal Chemistry
- 530 Physical Chemistry
- 532 Polymer Chemistry
- 534 Theoretical Chemistry
- 538 Chemistry, General
- 539 Chemistry, Other (see also #100)

=== Geological and Earth sciences ===
- 540 Geology
- 542 Geochemistry
- 544 Geophysics & Seismology
- 546 Paleontology
- 548 Mineralogy & Petrology
- 550 Stratigraphy & Sedimentation
- 552 Geomorphology & Glacial Geology
- 558 Geological and Earth Sciences, General
- 559 Geological and Earth Sciences, Other

=== Physics ===
- 560 Acoustics
- 561 Atomic/Molecular/Chemical Physics
- 564 Particle (Elementary) physics
- 565 Biophysics (also in biological/biomedical sciences)
- 568 Nuclear Physics
- 569 Optics/Photonics
- 570 Plasma/Fusion Physics
- 572 Polymer Physics
- 574 Condensed Matter/Low Temperature Physics
- 576 Applied Physics
- 577 Medical Physics/Radiological Science
- 578 Physics, General
- 579 Physics, Other

=== Ocean/marine sciences ===
- 585 Hydrology & Water Resources
- 590 Oceanography, Chemical and Physical
- 595 Marine Sciences
- 599 Ocean/Marine Sciences, Other

== Psychology ==
- 600 Clinical Psychology
- 602 Behavioral analysis
- 603 Cognitive Psychology & Psycholinguistics
- 609 Counseling
- 612 Developmental and Child Psychology
- 613 Human Development and Family Studies
- 614 Health and Medical Psychology
- 615 Experimental Psychology
- 618 Educational Psychology (also in education)
- 620 Family Psychology
- 621 Industrial and Organizational (See also #935)
- 622 Mental Health
- 624 Personality Psychology
- 627 Neuropsychology/Physiological Psychology
- 633 Psychometrics and Quantitative Psychology
- 636 School Psychology (also in education)
- 639 Social Psychology
- 648 Psychology, General
- 649 Psychology, Other

== Social sciences ==
- 650 Anthropology, General
- 651 Gender and Women's Studies
- 652 Area/Ethnic/Cultural Studies
- 655 Anthropology, Cultural
- 656 Anthropology, Physical and Biological
- 657 Criminal Justice and Corrections
- 658 Criminology
- 659 Criminal Sciences
- 662 Demography/Population studies
- 665 Natural Resource/Environmental Economics (also in agricultural sciences)
- 667 Economics
- 668 Econometrics
- 670 Geography
- 674 International Relations/Affairs
- 676 Linguistics
- 678 Political Science & Government
- 682 Public Policy Analysis
- 684 Gerontology (also in health sciences)
- 686 Sociology
- 690 Statistics (also in mathematics)
- 694 Urban Affairs/Studies
- 695 Urban/City, Community and Regional Planning
- 698 Social Sciences, General
- 699 Social Sciences, Other

== Humanities ==
=== History ===
- 700 American History (U.S. and Canada)
- 703 Asian History
- 705 European History
- 706 African History
- 707 Latin American History
- 708 Middle/Near East Studies
- 710 History, Science and Technology and Society
- 718 History, General
- 719 History, Other

=== Letters ===
- 720 Classics
- 723 Comparative Literature
- 724 Folklore
- 732 American Literature (U.S. and Canada)
- 733 English Literature (British and Commonwealth)
- 734 English Language
- 735 Creative Writing
- 736 Speech and Rhetorical Studies
- 737 Rhetoric and Composition
- 738 Letters, General
- 739 Letters, Other

=== Foreign languages and literature ===
- 740 French
- 743 German
- 746 Italian
- 749 Spanish
- 750 Latin American
- 752 Russian
- 758 Chinese
- 762 Japanese
- 768 Arabic
- 769 Other Languages and Literature

=== Other humanities ===
- 770 American/U.S. Studies
- 773 Archaeology
- 776 Art History/Criticism/Conservation
- 777 Jewish/Judaic Studies and History
- 778 Film/Cinema/Video Studies
- 780 Music
- 785 Philosophy
- 786 Music Theory and Composition
- 787 Music Performance
- 790 Religion/Religious studies
- 792 Bible/Biblical Studies
- 795 Drama/Theater Arts
- 798 Humanities, General
- 799 Humanities, Other

== Education ==
=== Research and administration ===
- 800 Curriculum & Instruction
- 804 Educational and Human Resource Studies/Development
- 805 Educational Administration and Supervision
- 806 Urban Education and Leadership
- 807 Educational Leadership
- 808 Educational Policy Analysis
- 810 Educational/Instructional Media Design
- 812 Educational/Instructional Technology
- 815 Educational Statistics/Research Methods
- 820 Educational Assessment/Testing/Measure
- 822 Educational Psychology (also in psychology)
- 825 School Psychology (also in psychology)
- 830 Social/Philosophical Foundations of Education
- 833 International Education
- 835 Special Education
- 840 Counseling Education/Counseling and Guidance
- 845 Higher Education/Evaluation and Research

=== Teacher education ===
- 850 Pre-elementary/Early Childhood Teacher Education
- 852 Elementary Teacher Education
- 856 Secondary Teacher Education
- 858 Adult and Continuing Teacher Education

=== Teaching fields ===
- 860 Agricultural Education
- 861 Art Education
- 863 English as a Second or Foreign Language
- 864 English Education
- 865 Bilingual and Multilingual Education
- 866 Foreign Languages Education
- 868 Health Education
- 870 Family and Consumer/Human Science (also in fields not elsewhere classified)
- 874 Mathematics Education
- 876 Music Education
- 878 Nursing Education
- 880 Physical Education and Coaching
- 882 Literacy and Reading Education
- 884 Science Education
- 885 Social Science Education
- 889 Teacher Education and Professional Development, Other

=== Other education ===
- 895 Workforce Education and Development
- 898 Education, General
- 899 Education, Other

== Business management/administration ==
- 900 Accounting
- 901 Finance
- 910 Business Administration and Management
- 912 Hospitality, Food Service and Tourism Management
- 915 Business/Managerial Economics
- 916 International Business/Trade/Commerce
- 917 Management Information Systems/Business Statistics
- 920 Marketing Management and Research
- 921 Human Resources Development
- 930 Operations Research (also in engineering and in mathematics)
- 935 Organizational Behavior (see also #621)
- 938 Business Management/Administration, General
- 939 Business Management/Administration, Other

== Communication ==
- 940 Communication research
- 947 Mass Communication/Media Studies
- 950 Film, Radio, TV, and Digital Communication
- 957 Communication Theory
- 958 Communication, General
- 959 Communication, Other

== Fields not elsewhere classified ==
- 960 Architecture/Environmental Design
- 964 Family/Consumer Science/Human Science (also in education)
- 968 Law
- 972 Library Science
- 974 Parks/Sports/Rec./Leisure/Fitness
- 976 Public Administration
- 980 Social Work
- 981 Social entrepreneurship
- 984 Theology/Religious Education (see also #774, #790)
- 989 Other Fields, Not Elsewhere Classified

== See also ==
- List of doctoral degrees in the US
- Joint Academic Coding System (UK classification)
- Australian and New Zealand Standard Research Classification
- List of academic disciplines
- Fields of science
