= Doctor of Engineering =

Professional doctorate in engineering

A Doctor of Engineering (DEng or EngD) or Doctor of Science in Engineering (EngScD) is a research doctorate in engineering and applied science. An EngD is a terminal degree similar to a PhD in engineering but applicable more in industry rather than in academia. The degree is usually aimed toward working professionals.

The Doctor of Engineering along with the PhD represents the highest academic qualification in engineering, and the successful completion of either in engineering is generally required to gain employment as a full-time, tenure-track university professor or postdoctoral researcher in the field. However, due to its nature, a Doctor of Engineering graduate might be more suitable for the Professor of Practice position. Individuals can use the academic title doctor, which is often represented via the English honorific "Dr".

Doctor of Engineering candidates submit a significant project, typically referred to as a thesis or praxis, consisting of a body of applied and practical methods/products with the main goal of solving complex industrial problems. Candidates must defend this work before a panel of expert examiners called a thesis or dissertation committee.

== International equivalent qualifications ==
Countries following the German/US model of education usually have similar requirements for awarding PhD (Eng) and doctor of engineering degrees. The common degree abbreviations in the US are DEng/EngD, DEngSc/EngScD, whereas in Germany it is more commonly known as Dr-Ing. The common degree abbreviation in the Netherlands is Professional Doctorate in Engineering (PDEng), which is equivalent to the EngD (as of 1 September 2022, the PDEng title in The Netherlands has been renamed to EngD).

"Dr.techn.", an abbreviation of "Doctor technicae" (German: "Doktor der technischen Wissenschaften") which also interchangeably translates to Doctor of Engineering Sciences, Doctor of Science, Doctor of Technical Sciences, or Doctor of Technology, is a doctoral title granted in Austria by universities of technology, such as TU Wien.

== History ==
To be admitted as a doctoral student, one must usually hold a Master's degree in engineering or related science subject and pass a comprehensive entrance exam. The student must complete the necessary required course work, be taught examinable courses, perform independent research under the supervision of a qualified doctoral advisor, and pass the thesis defense. The degree requires a high level of expertise in the theoretical aspects of relevant scientific principles and experience with details of the implementation of theory on realistic problems. The DEng takes three to six years (full-time) to complete and has compulsory taught components and coursework/projects and is granted in recognition of high achievement in scholarship and an ability to apply engineering fundamentals to the solution of complex technical problems.

A Doctor of Engineering degree awarded by universities in East Asia is equivalent to a PhD degree. To be admitted as a doctoral student, one must hold a master's degree in the same or related subject and pass a comprehensive entrance exam. The student must complete necessary course work, perform independent research under the supervision of a qualified Doctoral Advisor, and pass the thesis defense. It usually takes more than three years for a student with an M.S. Degree to complete his/her doctoral study. However, there are few areas of study (such as Materials Science, Polymer Technology, and Biomedical Engineering) where both Doctor of Science and Doctor of Engineering can be awarded depending upon the graduate school which houses the department.

In Germany the doctoral degree in engineering is called Doktoringenieur (Doktor der Ingenieurwissenschaften, Dr.-Ing.) and is usually earned after four to six years of research and completing a dissertation. A researcher pursuing a doctorate needs to hold a master's degree or the Diplom-Ingenieur degree (Dipl.-Ing.).

In France the degree of "Doctor-Engineer" (docteur-ingénieur) was a formerly applied science research degree. It was discontinued after 1984 and engineers wishing to go further as researchers now have to seek a PhD.

== British Higher Doctorate ==
In the United Kingdom, the D.Eng. degree was traditionally awarded as a higher doctorate on the basis of a significant contribution to some field of engineering over the course of a career. However, since 1992 some British universities have introduced the Engineering Doctorate, abbreviated as "EngD", which is instead a research doctorate and regarded in the UK as equivalent to a PhD.

== Modern British Engineering Doctorate ==
The Engineering Doctorate scheme is a British postgraduate education programme promoted by the UK's Engineering and Physical Sciences Research Council (EPSRC). The programme is undertaken for over four years. Students conduct PhD-equivalent research and undertake taught business and technical courses whilst working closely with an industrial sponsor. Successful candidates are awarded the degree of Doctor of Engineering (EngD) and are addressed as doctor.

In the UK a similar formation to doctorate is the NVQ 8 or QCF 8. However, a doctoral degree typically incorporates a research project which must offer an original contribution to knowledge within an academic subject area; an element which NVQs lack.

The Engineering Doctorate (EngD) scheme was established by the EPSRC in 1992 following the recommendations of the 1990 Engineering Doctorate Report, produced by a working group chaired by Professor John Parnaby. The scheme was launched with five centres - at Warwick, UMIST and Manchester universities and a Welsh consortium led by University College Swansea. After a 1997 review, a further tranche of five centres were established, and further centres were added in 2001 and 2006 following calls by EPSRC in particular areas of identified national need.

In a 2006 stakeholder survey of the scheme conducted on behalf of EPSRC it was found that the quality of output of research engineers was perceived to match or exceed that of a PhD. However, the majority of respondents disagreed with claims that EngDs were recruited to higher-paid posts than PhDs or that EngDs were more desirable to employers than PhDs. Observations were made that the EngD was not widely known, and that universities may offer EngD degrees that were not necessarily of the format promoted by the EPSRC.

A March 2007 "Review of the EPSRC Engineering Doctorate Centres" noted that since 1992, some 1230 research engineers had been enrolled, sponsored by over 510 different companies (28 had sponsored at least six REs), at 22 centres based at 14 universities (some jointly run by several collaborating universities). The panel remained convinced of the value and performance of the EngD scheme, and made six key recommendations including clearer brand definition, academic study of the longer-term impacts of the scheme, promotion of the scheme to potential new sponsors, business sectors and REs, work with the Engineering Council UK to develop a career path for REs to Chartered Engineer status, creation of a virtual "EngD Academy", and increased resources for the scheme.

Work on establishing an Association of Engineering Doctorates began in 2010.

== Relationship between DEng/EngD and PhD ==
In some countries, the Doctor of Engineering and the PhD in Engineering are equivalent degrees. Both doctorates are research doctorates representing the highest academic qualification in engineering. As such, both EngD and PhD programs require students to develop original research leading to a dissertation defense. Furthermore, both doctorates enable holders to become faculty members at academic institutions. The EngD and PhD in Engineering are terminal degrees, allowing the recipient to obtain a tenure-track position.

In other cases, the distinction is one of orientation and intended outcomes. The Doctor of Engineering degree is designed for practitioners who wish to apply the knowledge they gain in a business or technical environment. Unlike a Doctor of Philosophy (PhD) degree program, wherein research leads to foundational work that is published in industry journals, the EngD demands that research be applied to solving a real-world problem using the latest engineering concepts and tools. The program culminates in the production of a thesis, dissertation, or praxis, for use by practicing engineers to address a common concern or challenge. Research toward the EngD is “applied” rather than basic.

The PhD is highly focused on developing theoretical knowledge, while the EngD emphasizes applied research. Upon completion, graduates of PhD programs generally migrate to full-time faculty positions in academia, while those of EngD programs re-emerge in the industry as applied researchers or Executives. If working full-time in industry, graduates of EngD and PhD programs often become adjunct professors in top undergraduate and graduate degree programs.

== List of Universities or Research Centres ==
=== Malaysia ===
The following universities in Malaysia offer Doctor of Engineering degrees:

- University of Malaya
- University Sains Malaysia
- University of Putra Malaysia
- National University of Malaysia
- University of Technology Malaysia
- Universiti Tunku Abdul Rahman

=== The Netherlands ===
The following universities in the Netherlands offer Doctor of Engineering (EngD, previously referred to as PDEng) degrees:

- Delft University of Technology
- Eindhoven University of Technology
- University of Groningen
- University of Twente
- Wageningen University & Research

=== United States ===
The following universities which also happen to have an ABET accredited undergraduate degree offer Doctor of Engineering degrees:

- Colorado State University
- Columbia University
- George Washington University
- Johns Hopkins University
- Lamar University
- Morgan State University
- Old Dominion University
- Pennsylvania State University
- Purdue University
- Rensselaer Polytechnic Institute
- Southern Methodist University
- Texas A&M
- University of California, Berkeley
- University of Dayton
- University of Michigan–Ann Arbor
- University of Michigan–Dearborn

This listing is incomplete. ABET accreditation is not applicable to doctoral programs. Therefore, there are a number of schools with regionally accredited doctoral programs which are not on this list.

=== United Kingdom ===
In 2009, Engineering Doctorate schemes were offered by 45 UK universities, both singly or in partnership with other universities as industrial doctorate centres. Students on the scheme are encouraged to describe themselves as 'research engineers' rather than 'research students' and as of 2009 the minimum funding level was £1,500 higher than the minimum funding level for PhD students. Advocates of the scheme like to draw attention to the fact that EngD students share some courses with MBA students.

The following EPSRC-funded centres have offered EngDs:

- Advanced Forming and Manufacturing (University of Strathclyde)
- Biopharmaceutical Process Development (Newcastle University)
- Bioprocess Engineering Leadership (University College London)
- Centre for Doctoral Training in Non-Destructive Evaluation (Imperial College London, University of Bristol, University of Nottingham, University of Strathclyde, University of Warwick)
- Centre for Doctoral Training in Sustainable Materials and Manufacturing (University of Warwick, University of Exeter, Cranfield University)
- Centre for Digital Entertainment (University of Bath, Bournemouth University)
- COATED: Centre Of Advanced Training for Engineering Doctorates (Swansea University)
- Doctoral Training Partnership (DTP) in Structural Metallic Systems for Gas Turbine Applications (University of Cambridge, Swansea University and University of Birmingham)
- Efficient Fossil Energy Technologies (University of Nottingham, University of Birmingham and Loughborough University)
- Engineering Doctoral Centre in High Value, Low Environmental Impact Manufacturing (University of Warwick)
- Formulation Engineering (University of Birmingham)
- Industrial Doctorate Centre in Composites Manufacture (University of Bristol, University of Nottingham, University of Manchester, Cranfield University)
- Industrial Doctoral Centre for Offshore Renewable Energy (IDCORE) (University of Edinburgh, University of Strathclyde and University of Exeter)
- Innovative and Collaborative Construction Engineering (Loughborough University)
- Large-scale Complex IT Systems (University of Leeds, University of Oxford, University of St Andrews and University of York)
- Manufacturing Technology Engineering Doctorate Centre (University of Nottingham, University of Birmingham and Loughborough University))
- Machining Science (University of Sheffield)
- MATTER: Manufacturing Advances Through Training Engineering Researchers (Swansea University)
- Micro & Nano-Materials and Technologies (University of Surrey)
- Molecular Modelling and Materials Science (University College London)
- Nuclear Engineering (Imperial College London, University of Manchester)
- Optics and Photonics Technologies (Heriot-Watt University (lead), University of Glasgow, University of St Andrews, University of Strathclyde and the Scottish University Physics Alliance)
- STREAM - IDC for the Water Sector (Cranfield University, Imperial College London, University of Exeter, University of Sheffield, Newcastle University)
- Sustainability for Engineering and Energy Systems (University of Surrey)
- Systems (University of Bristol and University of Bath)
- Systems Approaches to Biomedical Science (University of Oxford)
- Technologies for Sustainable Built Environments (University of Reading)
- Transport and the Environment (University of Southampton)
- Urban Sustainability and Resilience (University College London)
- Virtual Environments, Imaging and Visualisation (University College London)

The following EPSRC-funded centres have offered EngDs:

- EPSRC and NERC Industrial Centre for Doctoral Training for Offshore Renewable Energy - IDCORE (University of Edinburgh, University of Exeter, University of Strathclyde and the Scottish Association for Marine Sciences)
- Renewable Energy Marine Structures (REMS) (Cranfield University, University of Oxford and University of Strathclyde)
- Centre for Doctoral Training in Sustainable Materials and Manufacturing (University of Warwick, University of Exeter, Cranfield University)
- Industrial Doctoral Centre for Offshore Renewable Energy (University of Edinburgh, University of Exeter, University of Strathclyde, the Scottish Association for Marine Sciences and HR Wallingford)
- Industrial Doctorate Centre in Composites Manufacture (University of Bristol, University of Nottingham, University of Manchester, Cranfield University)
- Centre for Digital Entertainment (University of Bath, Bournemouth University)
- Innovative and Collaborative Construction Engineering (Loughborough University)
- Large-scale Complex IT Systems (University of Leeds, University of Oxford, University of St Andrews and University of York)
- Bioprocess Engineering Leadership (University College London)
- Systems (University of Bristol and University of Bath)
- Micro & Nano-Materials and Technologies (University of Surrey)
- Nuclear Engineering (Imperial College London, University of Manchester)
- Optics and Photonics Technologies (Heriot-Watt University (lead), University of Glasgow, University of St Andrews, University of Strathclyde and the Scottish University Physics Alliance)
- Sustainability for Engineering and Energy Systems (University of Surrey)
- Transport and the Environment (University of Southampton)
- Molecular Modelling and Materials Science (University College London)
- Urban Sustainability and Resilience (University College London)
- Biopharmaceutical Process Development (Newcastle University)
- STREAM - IDC for the Water Sector (Cranfield University, Imperial College London, University of Exeter, University of Sheffield, Newcastle University)
- Systems Approaches to Biomedical Science (University of Oxford)
- Technologies for Sustainable Built Environments (University of Reading)
- Formulation Engineering (University of Birmingham)
- Efficient Fossil Energy Technologies (University of Nottingham, University of Birmingham and Loughborough University)
- Manufacturing Technology Engineering Doctorate Centre (MTEDC - University of Nottingham, University of Birmingham and Loughborough University)
- Centre for Doctoral Training in Non-Destructive Evaluation (Imperial College London, Bristol, University of Nottingham, University of Strathclyde, University of Warwick)
- Advanced Forming and Manufacture (University of Strathclyde)
- Machining Science (University of Sheffield)
- MATTER: Manufacturing Advances Through Training Engineering Researchers (Swansea University)
- COATED: Centre Of Advanced Training for Engineering Doctorates (Swansea University)
- Doctoral Training Partnership (DTP) in Structural Metallic Systems for Gas Turbine Applications (University of Cambridge, Swansea University and University of Birmingham)
- Engineering Doctoral Centre in High Value, Low Environmental Impact Manufacturing (University of Warwick)

== See also ==
- British degree abbreviations
- Doctor of Business Administration
- Doctor of Education
- Doctor of Philosophy
- Doctor of Science
- Doctor of Technology, an academic PhD-level degree
- Doktoringenieur, the equivalent engineering doctore degree in Germany
- Engineer's degree
- Engineering education
- Master of Engineering
