= Graduate science education in the United States =

In the United States, the PhD degree is the highest academic degree awarded by universities in most fields of study. American students typically undergo a series of three phases in the course of their work toward the PhD degree. The first phase consists of coursework in the student's field of study and requires one to three years to complete. This often is followed by a preliminary, a comprehensive examination, or a series of cumulative examinations where the emphasis is on breadth rather than depth of knowledge. The student is often later required to pass oral and written examinations in the field of specialization within the discipline, and here, depth is emphasized. After the comprehensive examination the student is a "PhD Candidate", which is the academic equivalent of a master's degree. Some universities will award terminal Master's for students who drop out of the PhD program at this stage, and some, like Columbia University and the Albert Einstein College of Medicine, award a Master's en route to the PhD. Some PhD programs require the candidate to successfully complete requirements in pedagogy (taking courses on higher level teaching and teaching undergraduate courses) or applied science (e.g., clinical practice and predoctoral clinical internship in PhD programs in clinical, counseling, or school psychology).

Another two to eight years are usually required for the composition of a substantial and original contribution to human knowledge in the form of a written dissertation, which in the social sciences and humanities typically ranges from 50 to 450 pages. In many cases, depending on the discipline, a dissertation consists of a comprehensive literature review, an outline of methodology, and several chapters of scientific, social, historical, philosophical, or literary analysis. Typically, upon completion, the candidate undergoes an oral examination, sometimes public, by his or her supervisory committee with expertise in the given discipline.

== Admission ==
There are 282 universities in the United States that award the PhD degree, and those universities vary widely in their criteria for admission, as well as the rigor of their academic programs. Typically, PhD programs require applicants to have a bachelor's degree in a relevant field (and, in many cases in the humanities, a master's degree), reasonably high grades, several letters of recommendation, relevant academic coursework, a cogent statement of interest in the field of study, and satisfactory performance on a graduate-level exam specified by the respective program (e.g., GRE, GMAT). Specific admissions criteria differ substantially according to university admissions policies and fields of study. Some programs in well-regarded research universities may have very low acceptance rates and require excellent performances on standardized tests and in undergraduate work, strong support in letters of recommendation, substantial research experience, and academically sophisticated samples of their writing (see, for example, eligibility requirements at Princeton University.)

The number of PhD diplomas awarded by US universities has risen nearly every year since 1957, according to data compiled by the US National Science Foundation. In 1957, US universities awarded 8,611 PhD diplomas; 20,403 in 1967; 31,716 in 1977; 32,365 in 1987; 42,538 in 1997; and 48,133 in 2007. Over this same period, the number of students attending university rose greatly, by about a factor of four. Grading of students in US universities has trended upward as well. In a study of 135 universities and colleges, Rojstaczer and Healy found that grade point distributions have undergone gradual but significant changes since the 1960s so that 'on average, A is now by far the most common grade awarded on American four year campuses.' The authors hypothesize that this phenomenon may be due to a general desire by schools and instructors to elicit positive evaluations from students; the high grades 'bear little relation to performance.'

== Funding ==
PhD students are usually discouraged from engaging in external employment during the course of their graduate training. As a result, PhD students at U.S. universities typically receive a tuition waiver and some form of annual stipend. The source and amount of funding varies from field to field and university to university. Many U.S. PhD students work as teaching assistants or research assistants. Graduate schools increasingly encourage their students to seek outside funding; many are supported by fellowships they obtain for themselves or by their advisers' research grants from government agencies such as the National Science Foundation and the National Institutes of Health. Many Ivy League and other well-endowed universities provide funding for the entire duration of the degree program (if it is short) or for most of it. Funding, availability of graduate/teaching assistantships, tuition waivers, grants, scholarships etc. will vary greatly based on their classification (see Carnegie Classification of Institutions of Higher Education). Smaller private universities that grant doctoral degrees may not provide any source of funding to doctoral students. The same is true for many online doctoral programs.

== Course of study ==
Depending on the specific field of study, completion of a PhD program usually takes four to eight years of study after the Bachelor's Degree; those students who begin a PhD program with a master's degree may complete their PhD degree a year or two sooner. As PhD programs typically lack the formal structure of undergraduate education or related professional degree education (JD, MD, DVM, MBA, etc.), there are significant individual differences in the time taken to complete the degree. Many U.S. universities have set a ten-year limit for students in PhD programs, or refuse to consider graduate credit older than ten years as counting towards a PhD degree. Similarly, students may be required to re-take the comprehensive exam if they do not defend their dissertations within five years after submitting it to their self-chosen dissertation advisors. Overall, 57% of students who begin a PhD program in the US will complete their degree within ten years, approximately 30% will drop out or be dismissed, and the remaining 13% of students will continue on past ten years.

The median number of years for completion of doctoral degrees for all fields in the U.S. is seven. Furthermore, doctoral applicants were previously required to have a master's degree, but many programs will now accept students immediately following their undergraduate studies. Many programs simply gauge the potential of a student applying to their program and will give them a master's degree upon completion of the necessary PhD course work. When so admitted, the student is expected to have mastered the material covered in the master's degree even though the student does not officially hold a master's degree. In some institutions, once the person has finished PhD qualifying exams, he/she is considered a PhD candidate, and may begin work on his/her dissertation.

=== Master's degree "en route" ===
As applicants to many PhD programs are not required to have master's degrees, many programs award a Master of Arts or Master of Science degree "en route", "in passing", or "in course" based on the graduate work done in the course of achieving the PhD students who receive such master's degrees are usually required to complete a certain amount of coursework and a master's thesis or field examination. Not all PhD programs require additional work to obtain a master's en route to the PhD (e.g., a master's thesis). Depending on the specific program, masters-in-passing degrees can be either mandatory or optional. Not all PhD students choose to complete the additional requirements necessary for the Master of Arts or the Master of Science if such requirements are not mandated by their programs. Those students will simply obtain the PhD degree at the end of their graduate study.

=== Candidacy ===
Candidate of Philosophy is a certification or a status, rather than a separate degree, that a postgraduate student achieves en route to a doctorate. It is abbreviated PhD (cand), PhDc, or simply PhC. Postgraduate programs vary in their requirements for completion of a doctorate, but most follow a pattern: completion of class requirements, a lower level exam, an upper level exam, and a final exam.

Candidacy is conferred or certified when the student has successfully satisfied specific requirements towards a doctorate, pending the completion of research projects and defense of a written dissertation. The completion of research, however, might or might not be necessary for candidacy. Rather, it depends on requirements that are specific to the program of study. The term "ABD" (All But Dissertation or All But Defended) usually means that a candidate has only to complete the writing and defense of the dissertation.

Although it is a minor distinction in postgraduate study, candidacy occasionally provides some benefits. It might mean an increase in the student's stipend and/or make the student eligible for employment opportunities. Neither of these, however, is guaranteed by candidacy. The primary benefit of PhD candidacy is that completion of the doctorate is nominally imminent so long as the student completes the final defense. This is, of course, not a given because a written dissertation and an oral defense of the student's work are typically not treated lightly by the faculty.

It is worth noting that the Candidate of Philosophy is not to be confused with Candidate of Sciences, an academic degree that has been used in certain countries in place of a PhD.

Some programs also include a Master of Philosophy degree as part of the PhD program. The MPhil, in those universities that offer it, is usually awarded after the appropriate MA or MS (as above) is awarded, and the degree candidate has completed all further requirements for the PhD degree (which may include additional language requirements, course credits, teaching experiences, and comprehensive exams) aside from the writing and defense of the dissertation itself. This formalizes the "all but dissertation" (ABD) status used informally by some students, and represents that the student has achieved a higher level of scholarship than the MA/MS would indicate – as such, the MPhil is sometimes a helpful credential for those applying for teaching or research posts while completing their dissertation work for the PhD degree itself.

In general, however, upon reaching the stage of Candidate, the student is by all rights the academic equivalent of a master's degree awardee. The new responsibilities of the student are a reflection of this status, and today this achievement is still recognized across the country by the existence of "terminal Master's" degrees for students who decide to end their studies. It is also embodied by Universities who adhere to the historic process of awarding an MA/MS or M.Phil. after comprehensive examination.

=== Dissertation ===
A thesis or dissertation is a document submitted in support of candidature for an academic degree or professional qualification presenting the author's research and findings. Dissertations and theses may be considered to be grey literature.

A thesis or dissertation committee is a committee that supervises a student's dissertation. This committee, at least in the US model, usually consists of a primary supervisor or advisor and two or more committee members, who supervise the progress of the dissertation and may also act as the examining committee, or jury, at the oral examination of the thesis (see below). At most universities, the committee is chosen by the student in conjunction with his or her primary adviser, usually after completion of the comprehensive examinations or prospectus meeting, and may consist of members of the comps committee. The committee members are doctors in their field (whether a PhD or other designation) and have the task of reading the dissertation, making suggestions for changes and improvements, and sitting in on the defense. Sometimes, at least one member of the committee must be a professor in a department that is different from that of the student.

In some U.S. doctoral programs, the term "dissertation" can refer to the major part of the student's total time spent (along with two or three years of classes), and may take years of full-time work to complete. At most universities, dissertation is the term for the required submission for the doctorate, and thesis refers only to the master's degree requirement. Generally speaking, a dissertation is judged as to whether or not it makes an original and unique contribution to scholarship. Lesser projects (a master's thesis, for example) are judged by whether or not they demonstrate mastery of available scholarship in the presentation of an idea.

In North America, the thesis defense or oral defense is the final examination for doctoral candidates, and sometimes for master's candidates. The examining committee normally consists of the thesis committee, usually a given number of professors mainly from the student's university plus his or her primary supervisor, an external examiner (someone not otherwise connected to the university), and a chair person. Each committee member will have been given a completed copy of the dissertation prior to the defense, and will come prepared to ask questions about the thesis itself and the subject matter. In many schools, master's thesis defenses are restricted to the examinee and the examiners, but doctoral defenses are open to the public.

The typical format will see the candidate giving a short (20–40 minute) presentation of his or her research, followed by one to two hours of questions. At some U.S. institutions, a longer public lecture (known as a "thesis talk" or "thesis seminar") by the candidate will accompany the defense itself, in which case only the candidate, the examiners, and other members of the faculty may attend the actual defense.

The result of the examination may be given immediately following deliberation by the examiners (in which case the candidate may immediately be considered to have received his or her degree), or at a later date, in which case the examiners may prepare a defense report that is forwarded to a Board or Committee of Postgraduate Studies, which then officially recommends the candidate for the degree. Potential decisions (or "verdicts") include: Accepted / pass with no corrections; The thesis must be revised; Extensive revision required; Unacceptable. At most North American institutions the latter two verdicts are extremely rare, for two reasons. First, to obtain the status of doctoral candidates, graduate students typically write a qualifying examination or comprehensive examination, which often includes an oral defense. Students who pass the qualifying examination are deemed capable of completing scholarly work independently and are allowed to proceed with working on a dissertation. Second, since the thesis supervisor (and the other members of the advisory committee) will normally have reviewed the thesis extensively before recommending the student proceed to the defense, such an outcome would be regarded as a major failure not only on the part of the candidate but also by the candidate's supervisor (who should have recognized the substandard quality of the dissertation long before the defense was allowed to take place). It is also fairly rare for a thesis to be accepted without any revisions; the most common outcome of a defense is for the examiners to specify minor revisions (which the candidate typically completes in a few days or weeks).

== History ==
The Doctor of Philosophy (PhD/D.Phil.) was first awarded in the U.S. at the 1861 Yale University commencement. The University of Pennsylvania followed shortly thereafter in 1871, while Cornell (1872), Harvard (1873), and Princeton (1879) also followed suit. Unlike the introduction of the professional doctorate M.D., there was considerable controversy and opposition over the introduction of the PhD into the U.S. educational system, even through the 1950s, as it was seen as an unnecessary artificial transplant from a foreign educational system (that of Germany), which corrupted a system based on the Oxbridge model of England.

== See also ==
- Foundation for Science and Mathematics Education
- Mathematics education in the United States
- Science and technology in the United States
