= All but dissertation =

Stage in earning a research doctorate

"All but dissertation" (ABD) is a term identifying a stage in the process of obtaining a research doctorate, most commonly used in the United States.

In typical usage of the term, the ABD graduate student has completed the required preparatory coursework and passed the required preliminary, comprehensive, and doctoral qualifying examinations or PhD candidacy examination. After the graduate student has successfully passed this examination stage, they are referred to as a "PhD candidate."

The informal ABD designation indicates that graduate student has met all program requirements except for writing of the dissertation (or thesis) and the final defense at the end of a PhD program. Formal usage of the term "Ph.D. (ABD)" can be seen as unethical or deceptive.

Some universities, including Columbia, the CUNY Graduate Center, George Washington University, The New School, New York University and Yale regularly award a formal Master of Philosophy (MPhil) degree for these achievements, while a number of campuses of the University of California award a Candidate of Philosophy.

== Dissertation completion pathway programs ==
As of 2026, several universities in the United States offer paths to complete a PhD or Doctor of Education degree for those that completed coursework and qualifying exams at another institution but ultimately did not complete the dissertation. Marywood University offers such a program leading to a PhD in Strategic Leadership and Administrative Studies. Antioch University offers a PhDLC completion pathway. Institutions with an EdD completion pathway include Carson-Newman University, D'Youville University, Manhattanville University and National University.

== Criticism ==
The use of ABD or the similar PhD(c) for PhD candidate (also PhD-c or PhDc) as a credential has been criticized as misleading as these terms are not widely understood outside of US academia.

The term ABD has no equivalent meaning in PhD programs outside of the US, in particular those without a requirement for a formal candidacy examination (e.g., Australia). According to the Queensland University of Technology (QUT) Higher Degree by Research Course Regulations, graduate students enrolled in a PhD program who have not completed a dissertation or other requirements are simply referred to as "PhD candidates" prior to completing any mandatory PhD coursework or examinations.

Even in the US, candidacy and ABD are not always synonymous. For example, in the Stanford University PhD program in computer science, a student may declare candidacy after settling on a permanent advisor and completing a number of breadth area requirements, but must pass a further qualifying exam, testing knowledge in greater depth, before being considered ABD.
