= Rigorosum =

Rigorosum is a type of examination, literally "rigorous one", commonly as a prerequisite to obtaining an academic degree, whose formal definition depends on the country. It may refer to:

- Oral exam, called Rigorosum in German-speaking countries
- Rigorosum (Slovakia)
- Rigorosum (Czechia)
- Rigorosum (Poland)
- Rigoroz (Slovenia)
- Rigoroz (Croatia)
- Rigoroz (Serbia)
- Szigorlat, Hungary, "rigorous exam"
