= Edited volume =

Collection of chapters by different authors

An edited volume, edited collection, or edited book, is a collection of scholarly or scientific chapters written by different authors. The chapters in an edited volume may be original works or republished works.

Alternative terms for edited volume are contributed volume and multiauthor volume. All these terms emphasize that the book is a collection of chapters contributed by different authors and harmonized by an editor. Edited volumes are of interest in academic publishing because they present different viewpoints and experiences on a common theme. An edited volume compiled and published to honor a particular individual is known as a Festschrift if presented during their lifetime, or as a memorial volume if published posthumously.

An edited volume is unlike an anthology, which is a collection of republished short literary works by different authors. It is also not a collected edition, which brings together already-published works by a single author and is edited by a publisher. It is different from a reader, which contains collected texts for learning purposes. Finally, it is different from proceedings, which contain articles written by different authors who present them at a scientific conference.

== Role of the editor ==
The editor (or editors, often there are several) of an edited volume is the key figure in conceiving and producing the book. The editor is responsible for determining the book's purpose, structure and style (as laid out in a book proposal); for signing a book contract with an interested publisher; and for selecting the individual contributors who will write the chapters (and possibly the foreword). Selecting the contributions may involve an open call for papers or may be conducted privately. The editor is also responsible for keeping the writing process on schedule and serves as the liaison between the publisher and the contributors. However, the task of "chasing contributions" can be substantial.

The editor may also be a contributor to the volume, by writing some chapters (often with other authors) and especially by preparing a preface, an introduction or an afterword summarizing the main points. The editor also carries out the linguistic and substantive editing of the chapters before submitting the book manuscript to the publisher, and coordinates authors' review and correction of the proofs (preprints).

== Contributors' responsibilities ==
Authors of individual chapters (contributors) sign contributor agreements that outline the topic and length of the chapter they are to write, the deadline for delivery, the copyright policy and the compensation (e.g. copies of the printed book). By accepting to contribute to the volume, they agree to prepare their chapters according to the book's style regarding, for example, the use of headings, illustrations, formatting and other text features.

== See also ==
- Compendium
- Compilation thesis
- Documentation
- Monographic series
- Treatise
- Volume (bibliography)
