= Honour Moderations =

First set of examinations at Oxford University

Honour Moderations (or Mods) are a set of examinations at the University of Oxford at the end of the first part of some degree courses (e.g., Greats or Literae Humaniores).

Honour Moderations candidates have a class awarded (hence the 'honours'). However, this does not count towards the final degree. In other courses, Prelims (i.e., preliminary examinations) are the first set of examinations but have no class awarded for them. These first examinations are termed 'First Public Examinations'. Having passed the First Public Examinations, students take a course leading to the 'Second Public Examinations', more commonly known as Finals. Finals are held at the end of all first degree courses at Oxford for arts subjects and may be split into examinations after the second, third and, if applicable, fourth year for some science subjects.

Honour Moderations in Classics has been called one of the hardest examinations in the world. However, in recent years, the subject matter has been changed so that proficiency in both Latin and Greek languages is no longer required and the number of papers in the exam has been reduced, along with an extension in the time allowed to finish.

== Mods in Classics ==
The Mods course in Classics (Literae Humaniores) runs for the first five terms of the course. The traditional aim was for students to develop their ability to read fluently in Latin (especially the Aeneid of Virgil) and Greek (concentrating on the Iliad and the Odyssey); this remains the case today, but the course has changed to reflect the continuing decline in the numbers of applicants who have had the opportunity to study Greek and Latin at school.

Since the early 1970s, students can begin learning Greek during the preparation for Mods (an option originally called Mods-B, the brainchild of John G Griffiths of Jesus College). More recently, due to the omission of Latin and Greek from the National Curriculum since 1988, options have been added for those without Latin either. Classics I at Oxford receives some of the most privileged students in the country, with a majority coming from fee-paying schools with high-quality teaching. It is also statistically one of the courses with the highest acceptance rates.

There are now five alternative paths through Mods:

- Students with both Latin and Greek at A-level or equivalent take the traditional route, Mods IA.
- Those with one such language do Mods IB (Latin plus beginners' Greek) or Mods IC (Greek plus beginners' Latin).
- Students with a strong aptitude for languages who have not learned Latin or Greek can take either Mods IIA (beginners' Latin only) or Mods IIB (beginners' Greek only).

Language tuition is now organized centrally within the University by the Faculty of Classics, leaving the colleges free to concentrate on teaching classical literature/rhetoric, history and philosophy.

The Mods examination has a reputation as something of an ordeal. It has changed in the 21st century from 11 or 12 three-hour papers across seven consecutive days into 10 or 11 three-hour papers across seven or eight days. Candidates for Classical Mods thus still face a much larger number of exams than undergraduates reading for most other degrees at Oxford sit for their Mods, Prelims or even, in many cases, Finals.

Students who pass Mods may then go on to study the full Greats course in their remaining seven terms. Those choosing the 'Course II' version are expected to read as many of their Finals texts in the original of their chosen language as those on Course I. Moreover, there is the option of studying the second Classical language as two papers at Finals.

== See also ==
- Tripos (Cambridge)
