= Comprehensive examination =

Type of examination in higher education

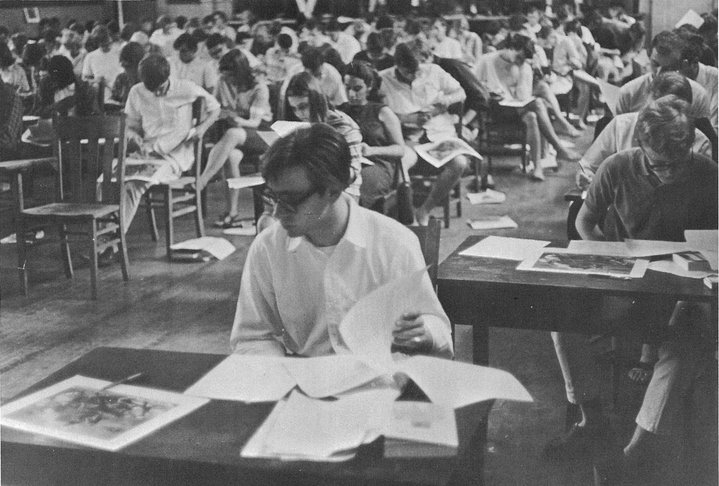
Shimer College students taking a comprehensive exam, 1966.

In higher education, a comprehensive examination (or comprehensive exam or exams), often abbreviated as "comps", is a specific type of examination that must be completed by graduate students in some disciplines and courses of study, and also by undergraduate students in some institutions and departments. Unlike final examinations, comprehensive examinations are not linked to any particular course, but rather test knowledge across one or more general fields of study.

Graduate-level comprehensive examinations are sometimes also known as preliminary examinations ("prelims"), general examinations ("generals"), qualifying examinations ("quals"), or as major field examinations. If these examinations are held orally, they may be known colloquially as "orals." The comps most commonly come after the student has completed required coursework and before starting on the dissertation; successful passage of the comps is sometimes required for a student to be considered a "Ph.D. candidate."

The form and general requirements for the comprehensive exam vary according to the faculty or department, degree sought, university, and country, but typically tests knowledge of the student's subject area and two or more related areas, and may be used to determine a candidate's eligibility to continue their course of study. At the graduate level, the purpose of the comprehensive exam is to ensure the student is familiar enough with their area of research to make original contributions.

There is no standard definition for what such exams entail, with some universities having almost no exam, whilst at other universities the process is quite rigorous. The exams thus take a number of forms, including an informal meeting of just a few hours, a critical review of one's academic portfolio, the submission of an academic paper which may take several hours or months to write, or a series of proctored exams taking anywhere from a few hours to a week.

The comprehensive examination system is used primarily in US and Canadian higher education, but it has also been adopted by some programs in other countries such as Pakistan and India. Other countries use alternative forms of evaluating Ph.D. candidates: in the United Kingdom, for example, students typically must first enroll in an M.Phil. program and are then admitted to doctoral study only upon successfully defending their research proposal.

== Undergraduate ==
Some colleges or universities in the United States require undergraduate students to pass comprehensive examinations in order to receive their degree. These include Wabash College, Kenyon College, Bethany College, The Catholic University of America, The University of Iowa, Maryville College, Occidental College, Reed College, The University of the South, Eckerd College, Millsaps College, Earlham College, Hanover College, Rosemont College, St. Anselm College, Shimer College, Whitman College, and University of Dallas. Students at Reed College must also "qual" in order to start their thesis process.

Many degree programs require students to pass comprehensive examinations within colleges or universities that don't otherwise require them. The same is true for many schools and colleges within larger universities. These include Texas A&M-Commerce Honors College, The University of Virginia's Politics Honors Program, and the University of Alabama at Birmingham's Mass Communications program.

== Graduate ==
=== Master's ===
In some terminal non-thesis Master's programs, successful completion of a comprehensive examination, conducted online or through the university's testing center, is a requirement for graduation during a student's last semester of coursework. A prominent example of such is the Major Field Test for Master of Business Administration (MFT-MBA) which has been used in the MBA programs of over 300 U.S. universities.

A comprehensive exam may also be required for a master's degree earned on the way to the completion of a doctoral program. In such cases, students might take an oral exam and/or field exam in order to both earn a Master's in their field and advance to the status of doctoral or PhD candidate. Typically, one exam will question the student on theory while the other will show competency or expertise in their chosen subfield (or major field) within their program. This also allows students enrolled in the program who do not wish to continue to the completion of a doctoral degree to leave early and in good standing with a Master's.

=== Doctoral ===
In most doctoral programs, students must take a series of written cumulative examinations on the subject of their study in the first year or two of the PhD program. These cumulative exams are often given on a pass/fail basis and a graduate student who seeks to continue in the PhD program must pass a minimum number of these cumulative exams. After this minimum number of cumulative exams is passed, this degree requirement is considered to be met, and the PhD student no longer takes these exams but continues work on other PhD requirements. In some fields, such as history, the student must pass the comprehensive examinations before submitting a dissertation proposal.

Typically, comprehensive exams consist of either a written or an oral exam, but some programs require both. In others, a written exam is taken, and depending on the grade, the student may or may not have to continue with an oral exam. In some fields, the level of detailed knowledge required is relatively limited, while in others such as economics the level of detail is similar to a final exam.

Comprehensive examinations are often based on a reading list agreed upon by the student and their committee, which is staffed by the primary supervisor and several advisors, normally professors at the university, but not necessarily in the same faculty. They also frequently have a standardized component for all students in the discipline, or may be entirely standardized. This reading list may comprise dozens or hundreds of books and other works.

For some social science and many humanities disciplines, graduate students might not have studied the discipline at the undergraduate level. These examinations will be the first set of comprehensive exams, and be based either on graduate coursework or on specific preparatory reading (sometimes up to a year's work in reading).

Preparing for comprehensive exams is normally both stressful and time consuming. Passing them allows the student to stay, begin doctoral research, and rise to the status of a doctoral candidate. Failing usually results in the student leaving the program or re-taking the test after some time has passed. A second failure normally guarantees dismissal from the graduate program, though progress on previous attempts may convince the student's program to grant a third, final attempt. Some schools have an intermediate category, passing at the master's level, which does not permit the student to continue doctoral study, but does allow the student to leave with a master's degree despite not having completed a thesis.

In some U.S. graduate programs, particularly in the natural sciences, the majority of students do not have master's degrees when they begin doctoral work, and the successful students will earn doctorates without getting master's degrees on the way. In these programs, a student who does not pass "comps" or "prelims" on the second attempt will generally be allowed to earn a terminal master's degree but is not permitted to become a candidate for a doctoral degree. At some institutions, students who pass the exam and are formally accepted as PhD candidates are technically entitled to a Master of Arts or Master of Sciences degree, but submitting an application is required, so no master's degree will be awarded unless the student specifically requests it. Other institutions issue an All But Dissertation certificate after a student has passed the comprehensive exams.

PhD students at some Canadian universities must complete their comprehensive exams by the end of their second year; those who fail to pass with a sufficiently high mark may retake the examination usually only once. Failure to pass a second time will normally result in expulsion from the program. Students who pass are distinguished with the title "PhD candidate."

== See also ==
- Final examination
- Educational assessment
- Oral exam

== Works cited ==
- Bernstein, B.L. (2014). "The Continuing Evolution of the Research Doctorate". In Nerad, Maresi; Evans, Barbara (eds.). Globalization and Its Impacts on the Quality of PhD Education. ISBN 9789462095670.
- Gonsalves, Valerie M.; Georges, Leah Skovran; Huss, Matthew T. (2011). "Preparing for Comprehensive Exams". In Peter J. Giordano; Stephen F. Davis; Carolyn A. Licht (eds.). Your Graduate Training in Psychology. ISBN 9781412994934.
- Rossman, Mark H. (2002). Negotiating Graduate School: A Guide for Graduate Students. ISBN 9780761924845.
