= Major Field Test for Master of Business Administration =

American national standardized MBA exam

The Major Field Test for Master of Business Administration (MFT-MBA) is a national standardized exam administered in the United States at the end of MBA programs. It is a comprehensive exit exam. The MFT-MBA aims to assess skills, knowledge, and reasoning ability within the domain of standard MBA curriculum. It is administered by Educational Testing Service (ETS) and has been used in the MBA programs of over 300 U.S. universities.

== History ==
Most MBA programs require an exit exam to gauge students' comprehensive competency in the field of business management. The MFT-MBA began being offered in 2002. It was developed nationally by leading educators to assess the skills of graduating MBA students. It is also used as a tool to compare business programs across the United States. ETS issues an updated test every 3–4 years in attempt to ensure high content validity. The most recent test forms are 4BMF (February 2005 - June 2009), 4FMF (September 2009 - June 2013), and 4JMF (September 2013 – present).

== Content ==
The MFT-MBA is based on MBA core curriculum. Unlike tests that are not aligned to anything but their own curriculum, the MFT-MBA emphasizes content validity. In order to display normativity and ensure a consensus of what best reflects core curriculum, the content is constructed using results of a national curriculum survey. According to ETS, content experts from a diverse representation of higher education institutions (including Major Field Test users and nonusers) participate in this survey. Basing the exam on core curriculum makes it a level playing field exam, giving it meaningful results and enabling it to measure reasoning ability.

The test contains 124 multiple-choice questions. There are approximately 32 management questions, 31 marketing questions, 33 finance questions, and 28 managerial accounting questions. Half of the questions require the strategic integration of two or more subject areas. In addition to factual knowledge, the test evaluates the student's abilities to interpret materials, understand relationships, and analyze and solve problems.

The Major Field Test for MBA can only be taken once. The amount of time allotted for taking the test is three hours. It is taken on a computer. All exams are given at proctored facilities. Test takers are provided with scratch paper and pencils, but calculators are not permitted. All test questions present four answer options to choose from, only one of which is correct.

== Scoring ==
Scoring summary
Percentile	Score
99	284
91	271
80	264
70	258
62	254
50	249
42	245
31	239
20	233
10	227

A national scoring guide is issued annually. Scores range from 220-300. According to ETS, the overall scaled score on the MFT-MBA measures critical thinking and reasoning within the domain of standard MBA curriculum. The chart on the right provides a scoring summary at approximately every 10th percentile.

Form 4BMF was last used in 2009 making the 2009 scoring guide 4BMF's last scoring guide. Form 4FMF was last used in 2013 making the 2013 scoring guide 4FMF's last scoring guide. The 2015 scoring guide is the most up to date guide for 4JMF (the current test form).

== Recognition of top performers ==
Several universities such as Rutgers, LSU, and the University of Nebraska at Omaha give awards to recognize their students whom received top scores on the MFT-MBA. The honors society T10 uses the MFT-MBA to recognize the top 10% of MBAs in the United States.

== Use by accreditation bodies ==
The MFT-MBA and similar tests are used by business school accreditation bodies such as the International Assembly for Collegiate Business Education (IACBE), the Association to Advance Collegiate Schools of Business (AACSB), and the Accreditation Council for Business Schools and Programs (ACBSP) to satisfy their assessment and accountability requirements.

== See also ==
- Master of Business Administration
- Comprehensive exam
