= Monograph =

Long-form work on a subject

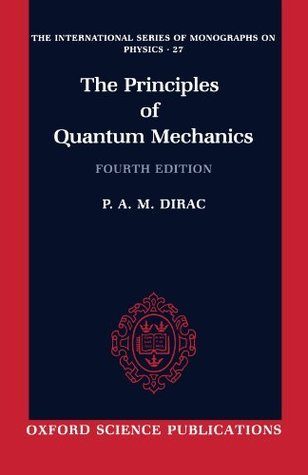
Front cover of The Principles of Quantum Mechanics (4th ed.) by Paul Dirac

A monograph is generally a long-form work on one (usually scholarly) subject, or one aspect of a subject, most often created by a single author or artist. Traditionally it is in written form and published as a book, but it may be an artwork, audiovisual work, or exhibition made up of visual artworks. In library cataloguing, the word has a specific and broader meaning, while in the United States, the Food and Drug Administration uses the term to mean a set of published standards as well as various guidelines.

== Written works ==
=== Academic works ===
The English term monograph is derived from modern Latin monographia, which has its root in Greek. In the English word, mono- means 'single' and -graph means 'something written'.

Unlike a textbook, which surveys the state of knowledge in a field, the main purpose of a monograph is to present primary research and original scholarship. This research is presented at length, distinguishing a monograph from an article. For these reasons, publication of a monograph is commonly regarded as vital for career progression in many academic disciplines. Intended for other researchers and bought primarily by libraries, monographs are generally published as individual volumes in a short print run. In Britain and the U.S., what differentiates a scholarly monograph from an academic trade title varies by publisher, though generally it is the assumption that the readership has not only specialised or sophisticated knowledge but also professional interest in the subject of the work.

A written monograph is usually a specialist book on one topic, although the term is sometimes used loosely, with its meaning being broadened to include any works which are not reference works and which may be written by one or more authors, or an edited collection.

This broadened use of the term, however, does not affect the essential difference in academic publishing and assessment between an authored academic book (i.e., a traditional academic monograph) and an edited volume (i.e., a non-authored book). In the case of an academic monograph, it is a "a focused work of scholarship pitched at a relatively high level of intellectual sophistication", whose author (or authors) has carried out the research and written the text of the book. By contrast, the editor of an edited volume owns the copyright to the concept, structure and organization of the book, as well as any text he or she has authored, while the authors of the individual chapters retain the copyright to the text and content of the chapters they authored.

=== Library definition ===
In library cataloguing, monograph has a broader meaning: a non-serial publication complete in one volume (book) or a definite number of books. Thus it differs from a serial or periodical publication such as a magazine, academic journal, or newspaper. In this context only, books such as novels are considered monographs.

== Types of monographs ==
=== Biology ===
In biological taxonomy, a monograph is a comprehensive treatment of a taxon in written form. Monographs typically review all known species within a group, add any newly discovered species, and collect and synthesize available information on the ecological associations, geographic distributions, and morphological variations within the group.

The first-ever monograph of a plant taxon was Robert Morison's 1672 Plantarum Umbelliferarum Distributio Nova, a treatment of the Apiaceae.

=== Art ===
Book publishers use the term "artist monograph" or "art monograph" to indicate books dealing with a single artist, as opposed to broader surveys of art subjects.

=== Film and multimedia ===
The term monograph is also used for audiovisual or film documentary-type representations of a subject, often creatively expressed. The term "monographic film" has also been used for short fiction or animated films.

Video or film essays on a single topic are also referred to as monographs.

IndyVinyl, by Scottish film academic Ian Garwood, is a monographic research project focused on "vinyl records in American independent cinema between 1987 and 2018". It includes an 8,000-word peer-reviewed academic book chapter; video compilations; "critical montages"; and a series of social media posts, all curated on a website. Garwood has written that his project is "an attempt to produce a research output equivalent to an academic monograph, but incorporating video-based forms of criticism that have been popularised through online film culture".

== FDA usage ==
In the context of Food and Drug Administration regulation, monographs represent published standards by which the use of one or more substances is automatically authorized. For example, the following is an excerpt from the Federal Register: "The Food and Drug Administration (FDA) is issuing a final rule in the form of a final monograph establishing conditions under which over-the-counter (OTC) sunscreen drug products are generally recognized as safe and effective and not misbranded as part of FDA's ongoing review of OTC drug products." Such usage has given rise to the use of monograph as a verb, as in "this substance has been monographed by the FDA".

== See also ==
- Compendium
- Compilation thesis
- Documentation
- Open access monograph
- Treatise
