= Thesis as a collection of articles =

Type of doctoral dissertation

A thesis as a collection of articles or series of papers, also known as thesis by published works, or article thesis, is a doctoral dissertation that, as opposed to a coherent monograph, is a collection of research papers with an introductory section consisting of summary chapters. Other less used terms are "sandwich thesis" and "stapler thesis". It is composed of already-published journal articles, conference papers and book chapters; and, occasionally, not-yet-published manuscripts. A thesis by publication is a form of compilation thesis (a term used in Nordic countries). Another form of compilation thesis is the essay thesis, which is composed of previously unpublished independent essays.

== Overview ==
The thesis by published works format is chosen in cases where the student intends to first publish the thesis in parts in international journals. It often results in a higher number of publications during doctoral studies than a monograph, and may render in a higher number of citations in other research publications – something that may be advantageous from research funding point of view and may facilitate readership appointment after the dissertation. A further reason for writing a compilation thesis is that some of the articles can be written together with other authors, which may be especially helpful for new doctoral students. A majority of the articles should be reviewed by referees outside of the student's own department, supplementing the audit carried out by the supervisory staff and dissertation opponent, thus assuring international standards.

Today, article theses are the standard format in natural, medical, and engineering sciences (e.g., in the Nordic countries), while in social and cultural sciences, there is a strong but decreasing tradition to produce coherent monographs, i.e., thesis as a series of linked chapters. At other times, doctoral students may have a choice between writing a monograph or a compilation thesis.

=== Introductory chapters ===
The introductory or summary chapters of a thesis by published works should be written independently by the student. They should include an extensive annotated bibliography or literature review, placing the scope and results of the articles in the wider context of the current state of international research. They constitute a comprehensive summary of the appended papers, and should clarify the contribution of the doctoral student if the papers are written by several authors. They should not provide new results, but may provide synthesis of new conclusions by combining results from several of the papers. They may supplement the articles with a motivation of the chosen scope, research problems, objectives and methods, and a strengthening of the theoretical framework, analysis and conclusions, since the extent of the articles normally does not allow these kind of longer discussions.

== See also ==
- Academic journal
- Academic publishing
- Doctor of Philosophy by publication
- Treatise
