= Thesis =

Work by academic candidate

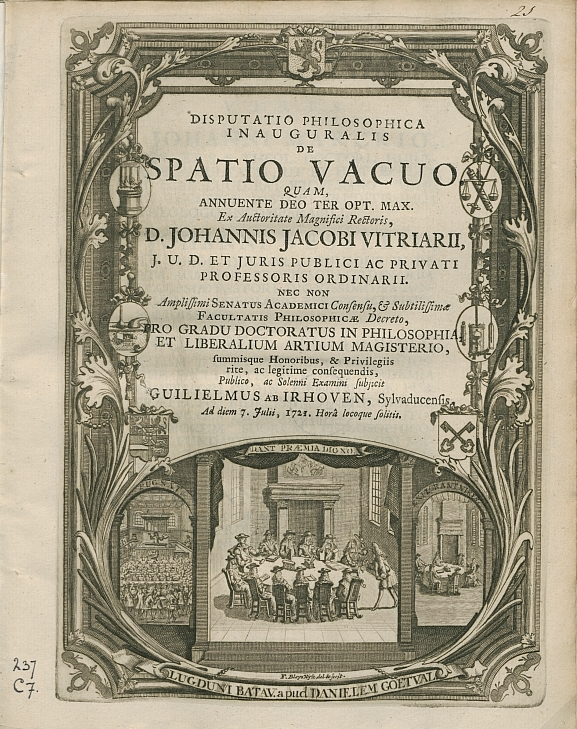
Dutch 18th century doctoral ceremony at Leiden University shown on the frontispiece of a PhD thesis, Netherlands. Disputatio philosophica inauguralis de spatio vacuo (lit. 'Inaugural Philosophical Disputation on Empty Space') by Guilielmus ab Irhoven (Willem van Irhoven) on the authority of the Rector magnificus Johannes Jacobus Vitriarius (Jan Jacob Glazenmaker), 7 July 1721.

A thesis (pl.: theses), or dissertation (Note: Originally, the concepts "dissertation" and "thesis" (plural, "theses") were not interchangeable. When, at ancient universities, the lector had completed his lecture, there would traditionally follow a disputation, during which students could take up certain points and argue them. The position that one took during a disputation was the thesis, while the dissertation was the line of reasoning with which one buttressed it.) (abbreviated diss.), is a document submitted in support of candidature for an academic degree or professional qualification presenting the author's research and findings. In some contexts, the word thesis or a cognate is used for part of a bachelor's or master's course, while dissertation is normally applied to a doctorate. This is the typical arrangement in American English. In other contexts, such as within most institutions of the United Kingdom, Commonwealth Countries, and Brazil, the reverse is true. The term graduate thesis is sometimes used to refer to both master's theses and doctoral dissertations.

The required complexity or quality of research of a thesis or dissertation can vary by country, university, or program, and the required minimum study period may thus vary significantly in duration.

The word dissertation can at times be used to describe a treatise without relation to obtaining an academic degree. The term thesis is also used to refer to the general claim of an essay or similar work.

== Etymology ==
The term thesis comes from the Greek word θέσις, meaning "something put forth", and refers to an intellectual proposition. Dissertation comes from the Latin dissertātiō, meaning "discussion". Aristotle was the first philosopher to define the term thesis.

A 'thesis' is a supposition of some eminent philosopher that conflicts with the general opinion ... for to take notice when any ordinary person expresses views contrary to men's usual opinions would be silly.

For Aristotle, a thesis would therefore be a supposition that is stated in contradiction with general opinion or express disagreement with other philosophers (104b33-35). A supposition is a statement or opinion that may or may not be true depending on the evidence and/or proof that is offered (152b32). The purpose of the dissertation is thus to outline the proofs of why the author disagrees with other philosophers or the general opinion.

== Structure and presentation style ==
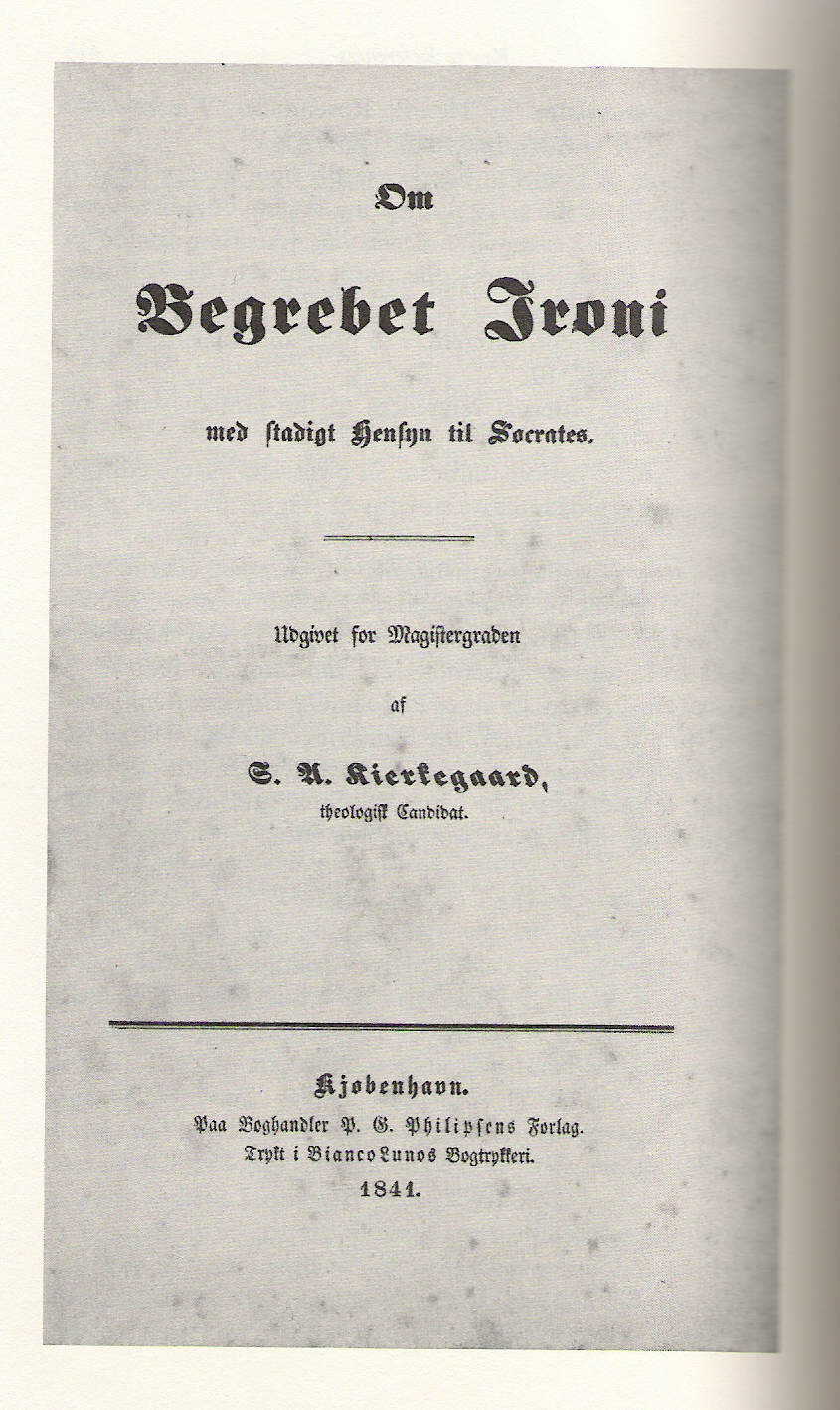
Title page to Søren Kierkegaard's university thesis (1841)

=== Structure ===
A thesis (or dissertation) may be arranged as a thesis by publication or a monograph, with or without appended papers, respectively, though many graduate programs allow candidates to submit a curated collection of articles. An ordinary monograph has a title page, an abstract, a table of contents, comprising the various chapters like introduction, literature review, methodology, results, discussion, and bibliography or more usually a references section. They differ in their structure in accordance with the many different areas of study (arts, humanities, social sciences, technology, sciences, etc.) and the differences between them. In a thesis by publication, the chapters constitute an introductory and comprehensive review of the appended published and unpublished article documents.

Dissertations normally report on a research project or study, or an extended analysis of a topic. The structure of a thesis or dissertation explains the purpose, the previous research literature impinging on the topic of the study, the methods used, and the findings of the project. Most world universities use a multiple chapter format:

a) an introduction: which introduces the research topic, the methodology, as well as its scope and significance
b) a literature review: reviewing relevant literature and showing how this has informed the research issue
c) a methodology chapter, explaining how the research has been designed and why the research methods/population/data collection and analysis being used have been chosen
d) a findings chapter: outlining the findings of the research itself
e) an analysis and discussion chapter: analysing the findings and discussing them in the context of the literature review (this chapter is often divided into two—analysis and discussion)
f) a conclusion: which shows judgement or decision reached by thesis

=== Style ===
Degree-awarding institutions often define their own house style that candidates have to follow when preparing a thesis document. In addition to institution-specific house styles, there exist a number of field-specific, national, and international standards and recommendations for the presentation of theses, for instance ISO 7144. Other applicable international standards include ISO 2145 on section numbers, ISO 690 on bibliographic references, and ISO 31 or its revision ISO 80000 on quantities or units.

Some older house styles specify that front matter (title page, abstract, table of content, etc.) must use a separate page number sequence from the main text, using Roman numerals. The relevant international standard and many newer style guides recognize that this book design practice can cause confusion where electronic document viewers number all pages of a document continuously from the first page, independent of any printed page numbers. They, therefore, avoid the traditional separate number sequence for front matter and require a single sequence of Arabic numerals starting with 1 for the first printed page (the recto of the title page).

Presentation requirements, including pagination, layout, type and color of paper, use of acid-free paper (where a copy of the dissertation will become a permanent part of the library collection), paper size, order of components, and citation style, will be checked page by page by the accepting officer before the thesis is accepted and a receipt is issued.

However, strict standards are not always required. Most Italian universities, for example, have only general requirements on the character size and the page formatting, and leave much freedom for the actual typographic details.

Increasingly, academic institutions are accepting digital and multimodal dissertations that include elements such as video, audio, or interactive software.

== Thesis committee ==
The thesis committee (or dissertation committee) is a committee that supervises a student's dissertation. In the US, these committees usually consist of a primary supervisor or advisor and two or more committee members, who supervise the progress of the dissertation and may also act as the examining committee, or jury, at the oral examination of the thesis.

At most universities, the committee is chosen by the student in conjunction with their primary adviser, usually after completion of the comprehensive examinations or prospectus meeting, and may consist of members of the comps committee. The committee members are doctors in their field (whether a PhD or other designation) and have the task of reading the dissertation, making suggestions for changes and improvements, and sitting in on the defense. Sometimes, at least one member of the committee must be a professor in a department that is different from that of the student.

== Role of thesis supervisor ==
The role of the thesis supervisor is to assist and support a student in their studies, and to determine whether a thesis is ready for examination. The thesis is authored by the student, not the supervisor. The thesis supervisor is a vital agent in forming institutional designs to help "at risk" students mature as scholars. The duties of the thesis supervisor also include checking for copyright compliance and ensuring that the student has included in/with the thesis a statement attesting that they are the sole author of the thesis.

== Regional and degree-specific practices and terminologies ==
=== Argentina ===
In the Latin American docta, the academic dissertation can be referred to as different stages inside the academic program that the student is seeking to achieve into a recognized Argentine University, in all the cases the students must develop original contribution in the chosen fields by means of several paper work and essays that comprehend the body of the thesis. Correspondingly to the academic degree, the last phase of an academic thesis is called in Spanish a defensa de grado, defensa magistral or defensa doctoral in cases in which the university candidate is finalizing their licentiate, master's, or PhD program, respectively. According to a committee resolution, the dissertation can be approved or rejected by an academic committee consisting of the thesis director and at least one evaluator. All the dissertation referees must already have achieved at least the academic degree that the candidate is trying to reach.

=== Canada ===
At English-speaking Canadian universities, writings presented in fulfillment of undergraduate coursework requirements are normally called papers, term papers or essays. A longer paper or essay presented for completion of a 4-year bachelor's degree is sometimes called a major paper. High-quality research papers presented as the empirical study of a "postgraduate" consecutive bachelor with Honours or Baccalaureatus Cum Honore degree are called thesis (Honours Seminar Thesis). Major papers presented as the final project for a master's degree are normally called thesis; and major papers presenting the student's research towards a doctoral degree are called theses or dissertations.

At French-language universities, for the fulfillment of a master's degree, students can present a "mémoire"' or a shorter "essai"' (the latter requires the student to take more courses). For the fulfillment of a doctoral degree, they may present a "thèse" or an "essai doctoral" (here too, the latter requires more courses). All these documents are usually synthetic monograph related to the student's research work.

A typical undergraduate paper or essay might be forty pages. Master's theses are approximately one hundred pages. PhD theses are usually over two hundred pages. This may vary greatly by discipline, program, college, or university. A study published in 2021 found that in Québec universities, between 2000 and 2020, master's and PhD theses averaged 127.4 and 245.6 pages respectively.

Theses Canada acquires and preserves a comprehensive collection of Canadian theses at Library and Archives Canada (LAC) through a partnership with Canadian universities who participate in the program. Most theses can also be found in the institutional repository of the university the student graduated from.

=== Croatia ===
At most university faculties in Croatia, a degree is obtained by defending a thesis after having passed all the classes specified in the degree programme. In the Bologna system, the bachelor's thesis, called završni rad (literally "final work" or "concluding work") is defended after 3 years of study and is about 30 pages long. Most students with bachelor's degrees continue onto master's programmes which end with a master's thesis called diplomski rad (literally "diploma work" or "graduate work"). The term dissertation is used for a doctoral degree paper (doktorska disertacija).

=== Czechia ===
In Czechia, higher education is completed by passing all classes remaining to the educational compendium for given degree and defending a thesis. For bachelors programme the thesis is called bakalářská práce (bachelor's thesis), for master's degrees and also doctor of medicine or dentistry degrees it is the diplomová práce (master's thesis), and for Philosophiae doctor (PhD.) degree it is dissertation dizertační práce. Thesis for so called Higher-Professional School (Vyšší odborná škola, VOŠ) is called absolventská práce.

=== Finland ===
The following types of thesis are used in Finland (names in Finnish/Swedish):

- Kandidaatintutkielma/kandidatavhandling is the dissertation associated with lower-level academic degrees (bachelor's degree), and at universities of applied science.
- Pro gradu(-tutkielma)/(avhandling) pro gradu, colloquially referred to simply as 'gradu', now referred to as maisterintutkielma by many degree-awarding institutions is the dissertation for master's degrees, which make up the majority of degrees conferred in Finland, and this is therefore the most common type of thesis submitted in the country. The equivalent for engineering and architecture students is diplomityö/diplomarbete. At many Finnish universities, the 21st century has seen a substantial reduction in the requirements for this thesis level.
- The highest-level theses are called lisensiaatintutkielma/licentiatavhandling and (tohtorin)väitöskirja/doktorsavhandling, for licentiate and doctoral degrees, respectively.

=== France ===
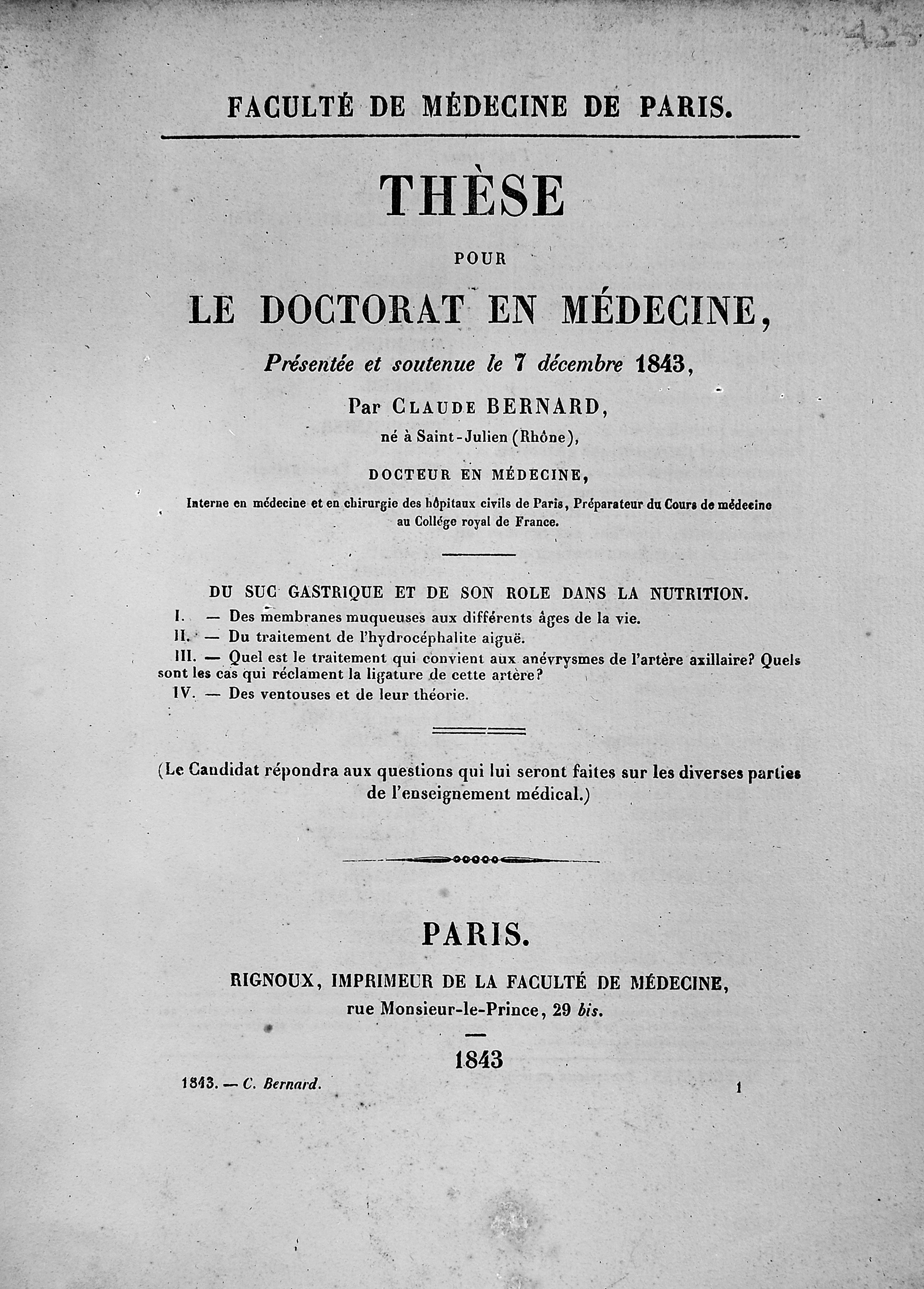
Title page of the thesis presented by Claude Bernard to obtain his Doctorate of Medicine (1843)

In France, the academic dissertation or thesis is called a thèse and it is reserved for the final work of doctoral candidates. The minimum page length is generally (and not formally) 100 pages (or about 400,000 characters), but is usually several times longer (except for technical theses and for "exact sciences" such as physics and maths).

To complete a master's degree in research, a student is required to write a mémoire, the French equivalent of a master's thesis in other higher education systems.

The word dissertation in French is reserved for shorter (1,000–2,000 words), more generic academic treatises.

The defense is called a soutenance.

Since 2023, at the end of the admission process, the doctoral student takes an oath of commitment to the principles of scientific integrity

In the presence of my peers. With the completion of my doctorate in [research field], in my quest for knowledge, I have carried out demanding research, demonstrated intellectual rigour, ethical reflection, and respect for the principles of research integrity. As I pursue my professional career, whatever my chosen field, I pledge, to the greatest of my ability, to continue to maintain integrity in my relationship to knowledge, in my methods and in my results.

=== Germany ===
In Germany, an academic thesis is called Abschlussarbeit or, more specifically, the basic name of the degree complemented by -arbeit (rough translation: -work; e.g., Diplomarbeit, Masterarbeit, Doktorarbeit). For bachelor's and master's degrees, the name can alternatively be complemented by -thesis instead (e.g., Bachelorthesis).

Length is often given in page count and depends upon departments, faculties, and fields of study. A bachelor's thesis is often 40–60 pages long, a diploma thesis and a master's thesis usually 60–100. The required submission for a doctorate is called a Dissertation or Doktorarbeit. The submission for a Habilitation, which is an academic qualification, not an academic degree, is called Habilitationsschrift, not Habilitationsarbeit.

A doctoral degree is often earned with multiple levels of a Latin honors remark for the thesis ranging from summa cum laude (best) to rite (duly). A thesis can also be rejected with a Latin remark (non-rite, non-sufficit or worst as sub omni canone). Bachelor's and master's theses receive numerical grades from 1.0 (best) to 5.0 (failed).

=== India ===
In India the thesis defense is called a viva voce (Latin for "by live voice") examination (viva in short). Involved in the viva are two examiners, one guide (student guide) and the candidate. One examiner is an academic from the candidate's own university department (but not one of the candidate's supervisors) and the other is an external examiner from a different university.

In India, postgraduate qualifications such as M.Sc. Physics accompanies submission of dissertation in Part I and submission of a Project (a working model of an innovation) in Part II. Engineering and Designing qualifications such as B.Tech., B.E., B.Des, M.Tech., M.E. or M.Des. also involves submission of dissertation. In all the cases, the dissertation can be extended for summer internship at certain research and development organizations or also as Ph.D. synopsis.

=== Indonesia ===
In Indonesia, the term thesis is used specifically to refer to master's theses. The undergraduate thesis is called skripsi, while the doctoral dissertation is called disertasi. In general, those three terms are usually called as tugas akhir (final assignment), which is mostly mandatory for the completion of a degree. Undergraduate students usually begin to write their final assignment in their third, fourth or fifth enrollment year, depends on the requirements of their respective disciplines and universities. In some universities, students are required to write a proposal skripsi or proposal tesis (lit. 'thesis proposal') before they could write their final assignment. If the thesis proposal is considered to fulfill the qualification by the academic examiners, students then may proceed to write their final assignment.

=== Iran ===
In Iran, usually students are required to present a thesis (پایان‌نامه, pāyān-nāma) in their master's degree and a dissertation (رساله, risāla) in their Doctorate degree, both of which requiring the students to defend their research before a committee and gaining their approval. Most of the norms and rules of writing a thesis or a dissertation are influenced by the French higher education system.

=== Italy ===
In Italy there are normally three types of thesis. In order of complexity: one for the Laurea (equivalent to the UK Bachelor's Degree), another one for the Laurea Magistrale (equivalent to the UK Master's Degree) and then a thesis to complete the Dottorato di Ricerca (Ph.D.). Thesis requirements vary greatly between degrees and disciplines, ranging from as low as 3–4 ECTS credits to more than 30. Thesis work is mandatory for the completion of a degree.

=== Kazakhstan ===
In Kazakhstan, a bachelor's degree typically requires a bachelor's diploma work (Kazakh: бакалаврдың дипломдық жұмысы), while the master's and Ph.D. degree require a master's/doctoral dissertation (Kazakh: магистрлік/докторлық диссертация). All the works are publicly presented to the special council at the end of the training, which thoroughly examines the work. Ph.D. candidates may be allowed to present their work without a written thesis, if they provide enough publications in leading journals of the field, and one of which should be a review article specifically.

=== Malaysia ===
Malaysian universities often follow the British model for dissertations and degrees. However, a few universities follow the United States model for theses and dissertations. Some public universities have both British and US style PhD programs. Branch campuses of British, Australian and Middle East universities in Malaysia use the respective models of the home campuses.

=== Pakistan ===
In Pakistan, at undergraduate level the thesis is usually called final year project, as it is completed in the senior year of the degree, the name project usually implies that the work carried out is less extensive than a thesis and bears lesser credit hours too. The undergraduate level project is presented through an elaborate written report and a presentation to the advisor, a board of faculty members and students. At graduate level however, i.e. in MS, some universities allow students to accomplish a project of 6 credits or a thesis of 9 credits, at least one publication is normally considered enough for the awarding of the degree with project and is considered mandatory for the awarding of a degree with thesis. A written report and a public thesis defense is mandatory, in the presence of a board of senior researchers, consisting of members from an outside organization or a university. A Ph.D. candidate is supposed to accomplish extensive research work to fulfill the dissertation requirements with international publications being a mandatory requirement. The defense of the research work is done publicly.

=== Philippines ===
In the Philippines, an academic thesis is named by the degree, such as bachelor/undergraduate thesis or masteral thesis. However, in Philippine English, the term doctorate is typically replaced with doctoral (as in the case of "doctoral dissertation"), though in official documentation the former is still used. The terms thesis and dissertation are commonly used interchangeably in everyday language yet it is generally understood that a thesis refers to bachelor/undergraduate and master academic work while a dissertation is named for doctorate work.

The Philippine system is influenced by American collegiate system, in that it requires a research project to be submitted before being allowed to write a thesis. This project is mostly given as a prerequisite writing course to the actual thesis and is accomplished in the term period before; supervision is provided by one professor assigned to a class. This project is later to be presented in front of an academic panel, often the entire faculty of an academic department, with their recommendations contributing to the acceptance, revision, or rejection of the initial topic. In addition, the presentation of the research project will help the candidate choose their primary thesis adviser.

An undergraduate thesis is completed in the final year of the degree alongside existing seminar (lecture) or laboratory courses, and is often divided into two presentations: proposal and thesis presentations (though this varies across universities), whereas a master thesis or doctorate dissertation is accomplished in the last term alone and is defended once. In most universities, a thesis is required for the bestowment of a degree to a candidate alongside a number of units earned throughout their academic period of stay, though for practice and skills-based degrees a practicum and a written report can be achieved instead. The examination board often consists of three to five examiners, often professors in a university (with a Masters or Ph.D. degree) depending on the university's examination rules. Required word length, complexity, and contribution to scholarship varies widely across universities in the country.

=== Poland ===
In Poland, a bachelor's degree usually requires a praca licencjacka (lit. 'bachelor's thesis') or the similar level degree in engineering requires a praca inżynierska (lit. 'engineer's/bachelor's thesis'), the master's degree requires a praca magisterska (lit. 'master's thesis'). The academic dissertation for a PhD is called a dysertacja or praca doktorska. The submission for the habilitation is called praca habilitacyjna/dysertacja habilitacyjna. Thus the term dysertacja is reserved for Ph.D. and Habilitation degrees. All the theses need to be defended by the author during a special examination for the given degree. Examinations for Ph.D. and habilitation degrees are public.

=== Portugal and Brazil ===
In Portugal and Brazil, a dissertation (Portuguese: dissertação) is required for completion of a master's degree. The defense is done in a public presentation in which teachers, students, and the general public can participate. For the Ph.D., a thesis (Portuguese: tese) is presented for defense in a public exam. The exam typically extends over 3 hours. The examination board typically involves 5 to 6 scholars (including the advisor) or other experts with a Ph.D. degree (generally at least half of them must be external to the university where the candidate defends the thesis, but it may depend on the university). Each university/faculty defines the length of these documents, and it can vary also in respect to the domains (a thesis in fields like philosophy, history, geography, etc., usually has more pages than a thesis in mathematics, computer science, statistics, etc.) but typical numbers of pages are around 60–80 for M.Sc. and 150–250 for Ph.D.

In Brazil the Bachelor's Thesis is called TCC or Trabalho de Conclusão de Curso (lit. 'Final Term/Undergraduate Thesis/Final Paper').

=== Belarus, Russia, Ukraine ===
In Belarus, Russia, and Ukraine an academic dissertation or thesis is called what can be literally translated as a "master's degree work" (thesis), whereas the word dissertation is reserved for doctoral theses (Candidate of Sciences). To complete both bachelor's and master's degree, a student is required to write a thesis and to then defend the work publicly. The length of this manuscript usually is given in page count and depends upon educational institution, its departments, faculties, and fields of study

=== Slovenia ===
At universities in Slovenia, an academic thesis called diploma thesis is a prerequisite for completing undergraduate studies. The thesis used to be 40–60 pages long, but has been reduced to 20–30 pages in new Bologna process programmes. To complete Master's studies, a candidate must write magistrsko delo (lit. 'master's thesis') that is longer and more detailed than the undergraduate thesis. The required submission for the doctorate is called doktorska disertacija (doctoral dissertation). In pre-Bologna programmes, students were able to skip the preparation and presentation of a Master's thesis and continue straightforward towards doctorate.

=== Slovakia ===
In Slovakia, higher education is completed by defending a thesis, which is called bakalárska práca (lit. 'bachelor's thesis') for bachelors programme, or diplomová práca (lit. 'master's thesis') for master's degrees, and also dizertačná práca (lit. 'doctor of medicine/dentistry degrees and dissertation') for Philosophiae doctor (Ph.D.) degree.

=== Sweden ===
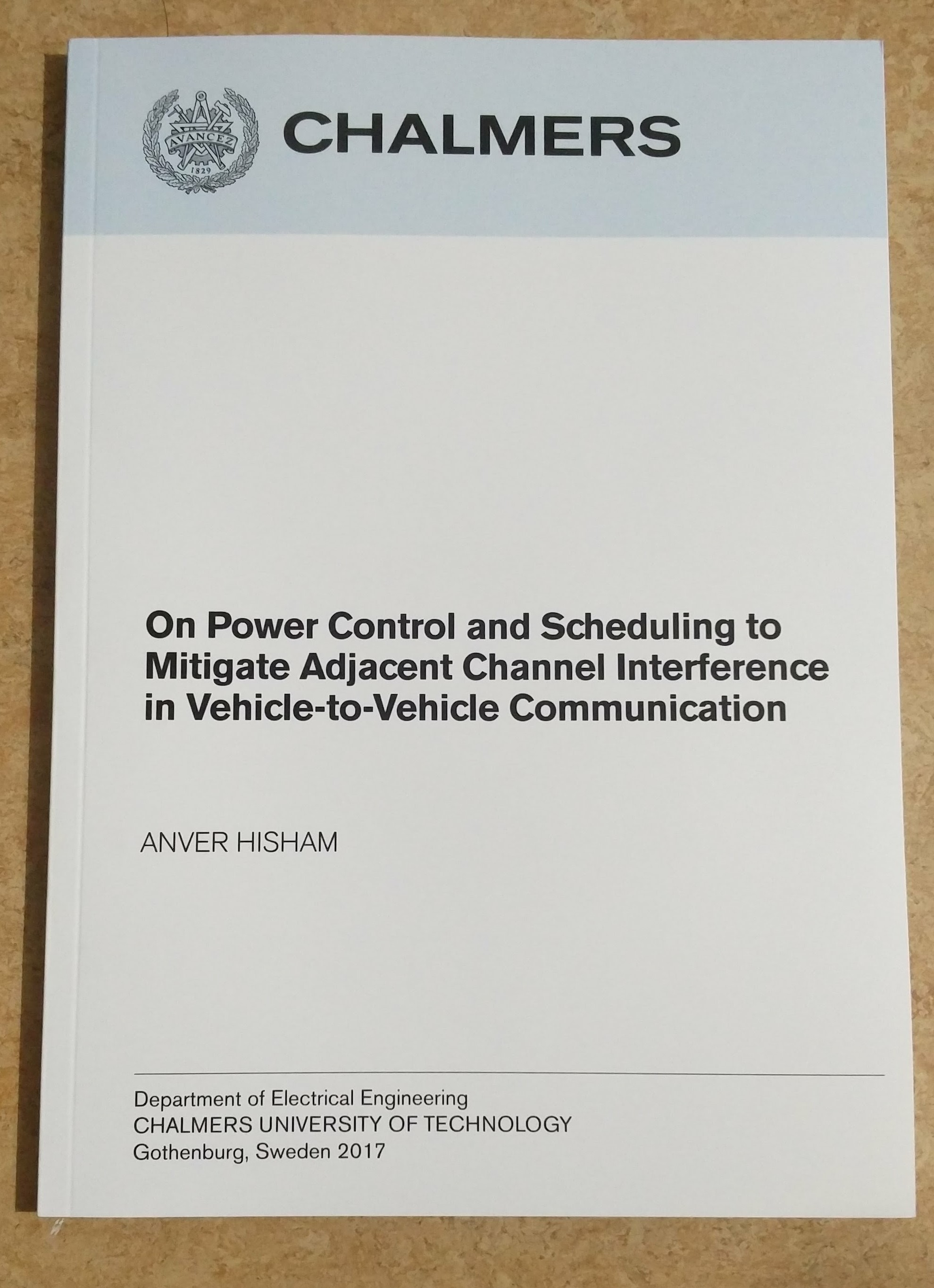
Cover page of a licentiate dissertation in Sweden

In Sweden, there are different types of theses. Practices and definitions vary between fields but commonly include the C thesis/Bachelor thesis, which corresponds to 15 HP or 10 weeks of independent studies, D thesis/Magister/one year master's thesis, which corresponds to 15 HP or 10 weeks of independent studies and E Thesis/two-year master's thesis, which corresponds to 30 HP or 20 weeks of independent studies. The undergraduate theses are called uppsats (lit. 'essay'), sometimes examensarbete, especially at technical programmes.

After that there are two types of post graduate theses: licentiate thesis (Swedish: licentiatuppsats) and PhD dissertation (Swedish: doktorsavhandling). A licentiate degree is approximately "half a Ph.D." in terms of the size and scope of the thesis. Swedish PhD studies should in theory last for four years, including course work and thesis work, but as many Ph.D. students also teach, the Ph.D. often takes longer to complete. The thesis can be written as a monograph or as a compilation thesis; in the latter case, the introductory chapters are called the kappa (lit. 'coat').

=== United Kingdom ===
Outside the academic community, the terms thesis and dissertation are interchangeable. At universities in the United Kingdom, the term thesis is usually associated with PhD/EngD (doctoral) and research master's degrees, while dissertation is the more common term for a substantial project submitted as part of a taught master's degree or an undergraduate degree (e.g. MSc, BA, BSc, BMus, BEd, BEng etc.).

Thesis word lengths may differ by faculty/department and are set by individual universities.

A wide range of supervisory arrangements can be found in the British academy, from single supervisors (more usual for undergraduate and Masters level work) to supervisory teams of up to three supervisors. In teams, there will often be a Director of Studies, usually someone with broader experience (perhaps having passed some threshold of successful supervisions). The Director may be involved with regular supervision along with the other supervisors, or may have more of an oversight role, with the other supervisors taking on the more day-to-day responsibilities of supervision.

=== United States ===
In some U.S. doctoral programs, the "dissertation" can take up the major part of the student's total time spent (along with two or three years of classes) and may take years of full-time work to complete. At most universities, dissertation is the term for the required submission for the doctorate, and thesis refers only to the master's degree requirement.

Thesis is also used to describe a cumulative project for a bachelor's degree and is more common at selective colleges and universities, or for those seeking admittance to graduate school or to obtain an honors academic designation. These projects are called "senior projects" or "senior theses"; they are generally done in the senior year near graduation after having completed other courses, the independent study period, and the internship or student teaching period (the completion of most of the requirements before the writing of the paper ensures adequate knowledge and aptitude for the challenge). Unlike a dissertation or master's thesis, they are not as long and they do not require a novel contribution to knowledge or even a very narrow focus on a set subtopic. Like them, they can be lengthy and require months of work, they require supervision by at least one professor adviser, they must be focused on a certain area of knowledge, and they must use an appreciable amount of scholarly citations. They may or may not be defended before a committee but usually are not; there is generally no preceding examination before the writing of the paper, except for at very few colleges. Because of the nature of the graduate thesis or dissertation having to be more narrow and more novel, the result of original research, these usually have a smaller proportion of the work that is cited from other sources, though the fact that they are lengthier may mean they still have more total citations.

Specific undergraduate courses, especially writing-intensive courses or courses taken by upperclassmen, may also require one or more extensive written assignments referred to variously as theses, essays, or papers. Increasingly, high schools are requiring students to complete a senior project or senior thesis on a chosen topic during the final year as a prerequisite for graduation. The extended essay component of the International Baccalaureate Diploma Programme, offered in a growing number of American high schools, is another example of this trend.

Generally speaking, a dissertation is judged as to whether it makes an original and unique contribution to scholarship. Lesser projects (a master's thesis, for example) are judged by whether they demonstrate mastery of available scholarship in the presentation of an idea.

The required complexity or quality of research of a thesis may vary significantly among universities or programs.

== Thesis examinations ==
One of the requirements for certain advanced degrees is often an oral examination (called a viva voce examination or just viva in the UK and certain other English-speaking countries). This examination normally occurs after the dissertation is finished but before it is submitted to the university, and may comprise a presentation (often public) by the student and questions posed by an examining committee or jury. In North America, an initial oral examination in the field of specialization may take place just before the student settles down to work on the dissertation. An additional oral exam may take place after the dissertation is completed and is known as a thesis defense or dissertation defense, which at some universities may be a mere formality and at others may result in the student being required to make significant revisions.

=== Examination results ===
The result of the examination may be given immediately following deliberation by the examination committee (in which case the candidate may immediately be considered to have received their degree), or at a later date, in which case the examiners may prepare a defense report that is forwarded to a Board or Committee of Postgraduate Studies, which then officially recommends the candidate for the degree.

Potential decisions (or "verdicts") include:

- Accepted/pass with no corrections.

The thesis is accepted as presented. A grade may be awarded, though in many countries PhDs are not graded at all, and in others, only one of the theoretically possible grades (the highest) is ever used in practice.

- The thesis must be revised.

Revisions (for example, correction of numerous grammatical or spelling errors; clarification of concepts or methodology; an addition of sections) are required. One or more members of the jury or the thesis supervisor will make the decision on the acceptability of revisions and provide written confirmation that they have been satisfactorily completed. If, as is often the case, the needed revisions are relatively modest, the examiners may all sign the thesis with the verbal understanding that the candidate will review the revised thesis with their supervisor before submitting the completed version.

- Extensive revision required.

The thesis must be revised extensively and undergo the evaluation and defense process again from the beginning with the same examiners. Problems may include theoretical or methodological issues. A candidate who is not recommended for the degree after the second defense must normally withdraw from the program.

- Unacceptable.

The thesis is unacceptable and the candidate must withdraw from the program. This verdict is given only when the thesis requires major revisions and when the examination makes it clear that the candidate is incapable of making such revisions.

At most North American institutions the latter two verdicts are extremely rare, for two reasons. First, to obtain the status of doctoral candidates, graduate students typically pass a qualifying examination or comprehensive examination, which often includes an oral defense. Students who pass the qualifying examination are deemed capable of completing scholarly work independently and are allowed to proceed with working on a dissertation. Second, since the thesis supervisor (and the other members of the advisory committee) will normally have reviewed the thesis extensively before recommending the student to proceed to the defense, such an outcome would be regarded as a major failure not only on the part of the candidate but also by the candidate's supervisor (who should have recognized the substandard quality of the dissertation long before the defense was allowed to take place). It is also fairly rare for a thesis to be accepted without any revisions; the most common outcome of a defense is for the examiners to specify minor revisions (which the candidate typically completes in a few days or weeks).

At universities on the British pattern it is not uncommon for theses at the viva stage to be subject to major revisions in which a substantial rewrite is required, sometimes followed by a new viva. Very rarely, the thesis may be awarded the lesser degree of M.Phil. (Master of Philosophy) instead, preventing the candidate from resubmitting the thesis.

=== Australia ===
In Australia, doctoral theses are usually examined by three examiners (although some, like the Australian Catholic University, the University of New South Wales, and Western Sydney University have shifted to using only two examiners) without a live defense except in extremely rare exceptions. In the case of a master's degree by research, the thesis is usually examined by only two examiners. Typically, one of these examiners will be from within the candidate's own department; the other(s) will usually be from other universities and often from overseas. Following submission of the thesis, copies are sent by mail to examiners and then reports sent back to the institution.

Similar to a thesis for a master's degree by research, a thesis for the research component of a master's degree by coursework is also usually examined by two examiners, one from the candidate's department and one from another university. For an Honours year, which is a fourth year in addition to the usual three-year bachelor's degree, the thesis is also examined by two examiners, though both are usually from the candidate's own department. Honours and Master's theses sometimes require an oral defense before they are accepted.

=== Germany ===
In Germany, a thesis is usually examined with an oral examination. This applies to almost all Diplom, Magister, master's and doctoral degrees as well as to most bachelor's degrees. However, a process that allows for revisions of the thesis is usually only implemented for doctoral degrees.

There are several different kinds of oral examinations used in practice. The Disputation, also called Verteidigung ("defense"), is usually public (at least to members of the university) and is focused on the topic of the thesis. In contrast, the Rigorosum (oral exam) is not held in public and also encompasses fields in addition to the topic of the thesis. The Rigorosum is only common for doctoral degrees. Another term for an oral examination is Kolloquium, which generally refers to a usually public scientific discussion and is often used synonymously with Verteidigung.

In each case, what exactly is expected differs between universities and between faculties. Some universities also demand a combination of several of these forms.

=== Malaysia ===
Like the British model, the PhD or MPhil student is required to submit their thesis or dissertation for examination by two or three examiners. The first examiner is from the university concerned, the second examiner is from another local university and the third examiner is from a suitable foreign university (usually from Commonwealth countries). The choice of examiners must be approved by the university senate. In some public universities, a PhD or MPhil candidate may also have to show a number of publications in peer reviewed academic journals as part of the requirement. An oral viva is conducted after the examiners have submitted their reports to the university. The oral viva session is attended by the Oral Viva chairman, a rapporteur with a PhD qualification, the first examiner, the second examiner and sometimes the third examiner.

Branch campuses of British, Australian and Middle East universities in Malaysia use the respective models of the home campuses to examine their PhD or MPhil candidates.

=== Philippines ===
In the Philippines, a thesis is followed by an oral defense. In most universities, this applies to all bachelor, master, and doctorate degrees. However, the oral defense is held in once per semester (usually in the middle or by the end) with a presentation of revisions (so-called "plenary presentation") at the end of each semester. The oral defense is typically not held in public for bachelor and master oral defenses, however a colloquium is held for doctorate degrees.

=== Portugal ===
In Portugal, a thesis is examined with an oral defense, which includes an initial presentation by the candidate followed by an extensive question and answer session.

=== Norway ===
In Norway, the final examination for a PhD student is called a disputas. The examination consists of a public lecture by the candidate where the audience can ask questions. Then two opponents will ask the candidate questions. Prior to the examination, the candidate must pass a trial lecture on a topic typically not part of the student's research. This is used to assess the candidate's ability to find the relevant literature and to disseminate knowledge to an audience.

=== Russia and Ukraine ===
A student in Russia or Ukraine has to complete a thesis and then defend it in front of their department. Sometimes the defense meeting is made up of the learning institute's professionals and sometimes the students peers are allowed to view or join in. After the presentation and defense of the thesis, the final conclusion of the department should be that none of them have reservations on the content and quality of the thesis.

A conclusion on the thesis has to be approved by the rector of the educational institute. This conclusion (final grade so to speak) of the thesis can be defended/argued not only at the thesis council, but also in any other thesis council of Russia or Ukraine.

=== Spain ===
The former Diploma de estudios avanzados (DEA) lasted two years and candidates were required to complete coursework and demonstrate their ability to research the specific topics they have studied. From 2011 on, these courses were replaced by academic Master's programmes that include specific training on epistemology, and scientific methodology. After its completion, students are able to enroll in a specific PhD programme (programa de doctorado) and begin a dissertation on a set topic for a maximum time of three years (full-time) and five years (part-time). All students must have a full professor as an academic advisor (director de tesis) and a tutor, who is usually the same person.

A dissertation (tesis doctoral), with an average of 250 pages, is the main requisite along with typically one previously published journal article. Once candidates have published their written dissertations, they will be evaluated by two external academics (evaluadores externos) and subsequently it is usually exhibited publicly for fifteen natural days. After its approval, candidates must defend publicly their research before a three-member committee (tribunal) with at least one visiting academic: chair, secretary and member (presidente, secretario y vocal).

A typical public Thesis Defence (defensa) lasts 45 minutes and all attendants holding a doctoral degree are eligible to ask questions.

=== United Kingdom, Ireland and Hong Kong ===
In Hong Kong, Ireland and the United Kingdom, the thesis defense is called a viva voce (Latin for 'by live voice') examination (viva for short). A typical viva lasts for approximately 3 hours, though there is no formal time limit. Involved in the viva are two examiners and the candidate. Usually, one examiner is an academic from the candidate's own university department (but not one of the candidate's supervisors) and the other is an external examiner from a different university. Increasingly, the examination may involve a third academic, the 'chair'; this person, from the candidate's institution, acts as an impartial observer with oversight of the examination process to ensure that the examination is fair. The 'chair' does not ask academic questions of the candidate.

In the United Kingdom, there are only two or at most three examiners, and in many universities the examination is held in private. The candidate's primary supervisor is not permitted to ask or answer questions during the viva, and their presence is not necessary. However, some universities permit members of the faculty or the university to attend. At the University of Oxford, for instance, any member of the university may attend a DPhil viva (the university's regulations require that details of the examination and its time and place be published formally in advance) provided they attend in full academic dress.

== Submission ==
A submission of the thesis is the last formal requirement for most students after the defense. By the final deadline, the student must submit a complete copy of the thesis to the appropriate body within the accepting institution, along with the appropriate forms, bearing the signatures of the primary supervisor, the examiners, and in some cases, the head of the student's department. Other required forms may include library authorizations (giving the university library permission to make the thesis available as part of its collection) and copyright permissions (in the event that the student has incorporated copyrighted materials in the thesis). Many large scientific publishing houses (e.g. Taylor & Francis, Elsevier) use copyright agreements that allow the authors to incorporate their published articles into dissertations without separate authorization. Once all the paperwork is in order, copies of the thesis may be made available in one or more university libraries. Specialist abstracting services exist to publicize the content of these beyond the institutions in which they are produced. Many institutions now insist on submission of digitized as well as, or even in lieu of, printed copies of theses; the digitized versions of successful theses are often made available online.

== See also ==
- Capstone course
- Compilation thesis
- Comprehensive examination
- Dissertation Abstracts
- Grey literature
- Postgraduate education
- Collection of articles
- Academic journal
- Academic publishing
- Treatise
