= Oral exam =

Educational assessment where questions are asked and answered verbally

The oral exam (also oral test or viva voce; Rigorosum in German-speaking nations) is a practice in many schools and disciplines in which an examiner poses questions to the student in spoken form. The student has to answer the question in such a way as to demonstrate sufficient knowledge of the subject to pass the exam. The oral exam also helps reduce (although it does not eliminate) the risk of granting a degree to a candidate who has had the thesis or dissertation ghostwritten by an expert.

== Overview ==
Many science programs require students pursuing a bachelor's degree to finish the program by taking an oral exam or a combination of oral and written exams to show how well a student has understood the material studied in the program. Usually, study guides or a syllabus are made available so that the students may prepare for the exam by reviewing practice questions and topics likely to be on the exam. There is a small but growing body of literature on the use of oral examinations in undergraduate education in the English speaking world.

Some medical schools use oral exams for second and third year students to test knowledge but also the ability to respond on the spot. Students are required to take an oral exam prior to being awarded a PhD. Some universities allow the option of either taking written and oral exams or completing a project or thesis, but occasionally, all three are required for graduation. Oral exams are distinct from a defense of a thesis in that the questions in the latter are more narrow and specific to the topic of the thesis.

Graduate students are sometimes allowed to choose their examiners for oral exams.

Sometimes, the oral exam is offered in schools as an alternative to a written exam for students with a learning disability, like dysgraphia, developmental coordination disorder, or non-verbal learning disorder. Often parents of the students have to request that the oral exam be given to their child in lieu of the written exam.

A Private Pilot Oral Exam is also required as part of the FAA and CAA practical test for prospective pilots. An oral exam is also carried out by the Maritime and Coastguard Agency in the UK for the purpose of issuing certificate of competencies for Merchant Navy deck and engine officers.

The viva voce is a component of music diploma examinations administered by ABRSM, Trinity College of Music and London College of Music. Candidates are posed a series of questions by the examiner about their chosen pieces, the composer and musical era. Depending on exam board, candidates may also be required to do a short writeup on their pieces.

== See also ==
- Comprehensive examination
- Educational assessment
- Final examination
