= Prelim =

Type of school examination

The term prelim (short for preliminary examination) generally refers to an examination that qualifies a student to continue studies at a higher level, and/or allow the student to comprehend their studies and see how prepared they are for an upcoming examination. It can also act as a gauge on how knowledgeable one is within the chosen subject.

Prelim exams may pre-date the qualifying exam at some institutions, although some universities combine both concepts into one exam.

== United States graduate programs ==
In many United States institutions the term "Prelims" is used for the preliminary examinations required before a graduate student is permitted to begin working on a doctoral dissertation. Depending on the institution, "prelims" may also be called "qualifying exams" ("quals") or "general exams" (sometimes abbreviated as "generals"). Johns Hopkins University refers to the exam as "Doctoral Board Oral" Exam, or DBO, a change from the previous "Graduate Board Orals," or GBO, as it used to be referred. Practice in this regard varies among US Graduate School programs, and even among academic departments at the same institution. Some have a single examination or set of examinations, in which case they are typically called "Prelims." Other departments have two sets of examinations, one taken early in the student's graduate work called "Comps" because they are intended as a comprehensive survey of the student's overall preparation to undertake graduate-level work, and a later set known as "Quals" intended to assess the student's qualifications to undertake dissertation research. Typically a student who does not pass such examinations will be given one more chance. If a student does not pass on the final attempt, they are usually given the opportunity to graduate with a terminal Master's Degree. Some institutions require students to pass both a written and an oral qualifying exam. Upon passing the written portion, the student is required to select a committee of professors from their department of study, and this committee administers an oral exam. Upon satisfactory completion of the oral exam, the student is allowed to begin dissertation work, and that committee becomes the dissertation advisory committee.

In some university departments, graduate students seeking a Ph.D. degree must take a series of written cumulative examinations on the subject of their study in the first year or two of the Ph.D. program. These cumulative exams are often given on a pass/fail basis and a graduate student who seeks to continue in the Ph.D. program must pass a minimum number of these cumulative exams. After this minimum number of cumulative exams is passed, this degree requirement is considered to be met, and the Ph.D. student no longer takes these exams but continues work on other Ph.D. requirements. A student that has passed these testing requirements is formally known as a Ph.D. Candidate, Doctoral Candidate, or Candidate for the Degree. Students that have met these requirements may be colloquially referred to as A.B.D., which stands for All But Dissertation.

=== Cornell University ===
At Cornell University, however, the term has been expanded to refer to any examination that is preliminary to the final exam even for undergraduate courses. This usage is used throughout the University, and has become so popular that "prelim" is more commonly used than "test" or "exam."

== United Kingdom undergraduate programmes ==
=== University of Cambridge ===
Undergraduate degrees awarded by the University of Cambridge are assessed by means of examinations called triposes, which are divided into one or more Parts (most commonly two), each Part comprising one or two years' study. Some two-year parts are further divided into Parts Ia and Ib (or IIa and IIb), with a separate examination taken at the end of these years. However, some two-year Parts are assessed by means of a single examination at the end of the second year. For some of these (such as History, Classics & English) there exist preliminary examinations, which are sat at the end of the first year of study towards that Part. Whilst they do not count towards a student's final degree classification, a very poor performance in prelims can result in disciplinary measures.

=== University of Oxford ===
At the University of Oxford, prelims are a first set of examinations, normally during the first half of the degree course for some courses (e.g. for history). The highest results in prelims will be awarded a "Distinction", which also entitles the bearer to wear a scholar's gown. These examinations contrast with Finals at the end of all degree courses at Oxford.

== Singapore, Scotland and Latin America ==
In Singapore, and in Scottish National 5, Highers and Advanced Higher, the term is used for practice examinations held in schools before major national examinations, such as the Primary School Leaving Examination (PSLE), GCE 'N', 'O' and 'A' Levels in Singapore; and National 4 and National 5, Highers and Advanced Highers in Scotland. The papers are generally more challenging than the actual examination to prepare the students. Results from these prelims are used for provisional admission to a Singapore junior college, while those from the 'A' Level prelims are used to predict grades for the actual examination, which are often asked for by overseas university admission officers.

== South Africa ==
In the South African schooling system, Prelims are conducted during the student's final year of high school in preparation for the final exams. It is generally accepted that the Prelim exams are set slightly above the standard of the final year exams in order to provide the students with a 'wake up call' whilst not having a serious impact on their long-term prospects.
