= Master of Philosophy =

Postgraduate academic degree

- Acronym: MPhil or PhM
- Type: Postgraduate education
- Duration: 1 to 4 years
- Prerequisites: Bachelor's degree or master's degree (varies by country and institution)

A Master of Philosophy (MPhil or PhM; Latin Magister Philosophiae or Philosophiae Magister) is a postgraduate degree. The name of the degree is most often abbreviated MPhil (or, at times, as PhM in other countries). With a few exceptions, MPhils are awarded to postgraduate students after completing at least two years of original research, normally in the form of a thesis or dissertation. In many fields, the completion of a MPhil is typically required for employment as an expert or researcher. MPhil may also serve as a provisional enrolment for a PhD programme.

== Australia ==
In Australia, the Master of Philosophy is a research degree where candidates are assessed on the basis of a thesis. A standard full-time degree often takes two years to complete.

== Bangladesh ==
In Bangladesh, the Master of Philosophy (MPhil) is a postgraduate research degree offered by universities, including the University of Dhaka and Bangladesh Open University. At the University of Dhaka, the MPhil is awarded upon successful completion of prescribed coursework and research, with the programme normally extending over two academic years. Admission requirements are determined by the university's regulations and may include a master's degree or an equivalent qualification from a recognized university. Bangladesh Open University offers an MPhil programme on both a full-time and part-time basis; its regulations provide for a two-year full-time programme and a four-year part-time programme, with a thesis or research component forming part of the degree requirements. The University Grants Commission of Bangladesh also administers research-support and scholarship programmes that include MPhil study, reflecting the degree's place within Bangladesh's higher-education and research system.

== Canada ==
A Master of Philosophy degree was offered at the University of Toronto in Canada in 1963, with the first award in 1965.

The MPhil is offered at Queen's University in the Department of English as a two-year degree involving coursework, examinations, and practice at academic writing. Successful completion leads to a guaranteed place on a PhD course with "advanced standing", reducing the length of the PhD by a year.

== India ==
Indian universities used to offer MPhil degrees as the most advanced master's degree in the fields of arts, science and humanities. The duration was typically two years long and included both a taught portion and an extensive research portion. Several universities offered enrolment in their integrated MPhil–PhD program and MPhil degree holders were usually exempted from some of the doctoral coursework requirement. In July 2020, the Government of India announced that, as part of its new National Education Policy, MPhils would be discontinued in India. In 2023, the University Grants Commission reiterated that there should be no fresh admissions to MPhil degrees, as they are no longer valid.though state of West Bengal refused to accept the directive imposed by the UGC and decided to continue it depend on several factors such as university autonomy and student demands.

== Finland ==
In Finland, the regular master's degree filosofian maisteri translates to "Master of Philosophy". As in English, the term "philosophy" does not imply a specialization in theoretical philosophy. These degrees are regular master's degrees, not special "higher" degrees (cf. Licentiate and Doctor of Philosophy). In the past, filosofian maisteri signified that the degree was earned through actual studying, in contrast to honorary master's degrees that were granted upon application to bachelor's degree graduates.

== Malaysia ==
In Malaysia, the MPhil degree is commonly offered in a number of older and more-established universities in Malaysia, including the University of Malaya, Multimedia University (MMU), Wawasan Open University, University of Nottingham Malaysia (UNMC), Monash University Sunway Campus (MUSC) and Curtin Malaysia Campus. In most cases, the MPhil is largely a research degree, with only a minor taught component. On a case-by-case basis, candidates must pass a viva voce examination before the degree is awarded. For UNMC and MUSC, the Faculty of Engineering offers a standalone MPhil degree which will lead to the PhD.

Specifically for the University of Malaya, if the desired field of research does not belong to any of the specialized faculties, it is normally categorized under the MPhil supervised by the Postgraduate Institute.

== Netherlands ==
With the Bologna process the MPhil was introduced in the Netherlands in 2002. In most Dutch universities, the MPhil was a research degree in the social or human sciences, preparatory to a doctoral research trajectory. The completion of an MPhil typically required two years of full-time study.

In 2009, the Dutch Department of Education, Culture and Science decided not to recognize the MPhil degree anymore. Accordingly, Dutch universities stopped awarding this degree and now award the legally-recognized Master of Arts or Master of Science degrees instead.

== Pakistan ==
In Pakistan, the MPhil is one of the most advanced master's degrees offered by public and private universities in several different fields of study. This is usually a two-year full-time program which includes teaching and research that leads to the PhD. The degree of MPhil also served as a requirement to gain admission into a Doctoral program in Pakistan until early 2021.

== United Kingdom ==
In most UK universities, the MPhil is a research degree. The completion of an MPhil typically requires two years of full-time (or five years or more of part-time) study and the submission of coursework and a thesis comprising a body of original research undertaken by the candidate (typically 15,000 to 30,000 words). It is common for students admitted into a PhD program at a UK university to be initially registered for the degree of MPhil, and then to transfer (or upgrade) to the PhD upon successful completion of the first (or sometimes the second) year of study: this will often involve the submission of a report or dissertation by the student, and possibly an oral examination or presentation. Conversely, a PhD candidate may transfer to an MPhil programme or be awarded the degree of MPhil if they do not meet the requirements for the award of a PhD.

Usage can be different at the ancient universities. The MPhil at Oxford and Cambridge can be either a taught degree or a research degree, and may take one or two years, depending on the course. The University of Cambridge offers one-year full-time and two-year part-time MPhil taught degree programmes, with almost all taught MPhils being one-year programmes, as well as longer research MPhils similar to those elsewhere. This takes the place of the MA at other universities, as the Oxbridge MA is awarded to BA graduates after a certain period without any further study. At the University of Oxford, the MPhil is usually a two-year taught degree, but is a one-year research degree in some departments. The ancient Scottish universities, who for historical reasons award the Scottish MA upon completion of four-year first degree programs in arts and humanities subjects, differ in their use of MPhil or MLitt for postgraduate research degrees, but are slowly standardizing to the MPhil as a research degree and the MLitt as a taught degree.

== United States ==
Most American universities do not award the Master of Philosophy degree. A few institutions, such as Columbia University, the CUNY Graduate Center, George Washington University, The New School, New York University, Rutgers University–New Brunswick and Yale University, award it to PhD candidates when they complete their required coursework and qualifying examinations but have not yet completed and defended their doctoral dissertation. This formalizes the more colloquial "All But Dissertation" (ABD) status; as such, defense of a dissertation proposal is sometimes required for conferral. Others such as the University of California system, award the Candidate of Philosophy, which has been described as an equivalent degree.

John Perry Miller, then dean of the Yale Graduate School of Arts and Sciences, proposed the creation of the Master of Philosophy at Yale in 1966 and it was the first institution to award the degree in the United States in 1968. The name originated first at the University of Cambridge before being adopted at the University of Toronto and then appearing at Yale.

A 1970 report from the Carnegie Foundation for the Advancement of Teaching advocated for the new degree, claiming it would be "useful for future teachers in high schools, community colleges, and lower college divisions." In the same report the Carnegie Foundation advocated for the creation of the Doctor of Arts degree. The degree was instituted at Columbia University in 1973 and awarded retroactively to previous ABD doctoral candidates at Columbia.

Other colleges and universities, such as the College of the Atlantic, the University of Pennsylvania and Wesleyan University offer a standalone MPhil as an advanced graduate degree in various fields. At Wesleyan, candidates must already hold a master's degree or a terminal degree.

== See also ==
- Bachelor of Philosophy
- Candidate of Philosophy
- Doctor of Philosophy
- Master's degree
  - Master of Letters
  - Master of Research
  - Master of Studies
