= Candidate of Philosophy =

Master's degree

Candidate of Philosophy (PhC or CPhil, also called Candidate in Philosophy) is a status granted to PhD students who have been admitted to candidacy of that degree. The name may also be used for the degrees or former degrees at bachelor's or master's level from some Scandinavian countries.

== United States ==
In the United States, it is normal for graduate students working toward a doctorate to take coursework followed by examinations (known variously as candidacy examinations, comprehensive examinations or qualifiers) after which they become candidates for the doctorate. At a few institutions, this status is officially recognized either by a degree or some other official title. This is normally intended to be an interim status, prior to the award of a doctorate, not to be confused with the terminal master's degree awarded by some programs to those who leave after their candidacy examination. Some universities grant a Master of Philosophy (MPhil) degree to students who have been accepted for candidacy.

The first Candidate in Philosophy degree in the United States was awarded at the University of Michigan in May 1966, two years before Yale University awarded the first MPhil in the US in 1968. During the 1960s, Candidate in Philosophy degrees were also awarded at Indiana University, Northwestern University, University of Michigan, and University of Minnesota.

=== University of California ===
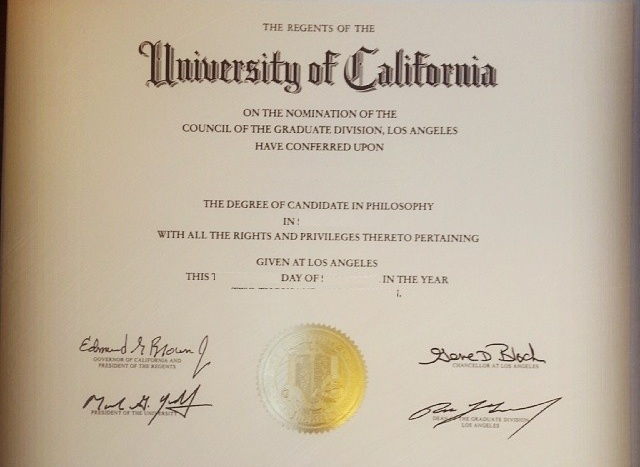
Candidate of Philosophy Awarded by UCLA

In recent years, seven of the ten University of California campuses offer the Candidate in Philosophy (CPhil) degree to those who have passed the candidacy exam for the PhD in some programs. On some campuses it is only awarded to those leaving without a master's or a doctorate, however at UC San Diego such a practice seems forbidden.

- University of California, Berkeley
- University of California, Davis
- University of California, Los Angeles
- University of California, Riverside
- University of California, San Diego
- University of California, San Francisco
- University of California, Santa Barbara

=== University of Washington ===
The University of Washington designates a Candidate in Philosophy (PhC) to those admitted to candidacy for the PhD, alongside the Candidate in Education (EdC) and Candidate in Musical Arts (CMA) for those admitted to candidacy for the degrees of Doctor of Education (EdD) and Doctor of Musical Arts (DMA). These are designations for candidate status rather than degrees.

== Scandinavia ==
=== Denmark ===
The candidatus/candidata philosophiae degree (cand.phil.) was a master's-level first degree. It was awarded after four years' study and included a dissertation. As part of the Bologna Process of degree reforms, it was abandoned in 1995/6.

=== Sweden ===
In Sweden, sv:filosofie kandidat (fil.kand. or FK) is the title for the holder of a bachelor's degree (filosofie kandidatexamen).

=== Finland ===
In Finland, the filosofian kandidaatti (fil.kand. or FK) was a graduate degree awarded until 1994. Holders can proceed to a Master of Arts degree without further examination.

== See also ==
- Candidate of Sciences, a degree granted by universities in some former Soviet Union countries that is similar in name but equivalent to a completed doctoral degree.

== Bibliography ==
- United States Office of Education (1917). Statistics of Land-grant Colleges and Universities. Original from the University of Michigan: Govt. Print. Off.
