= List of countries by literacy rate =

Literacy rates

This is a list of countries by literacy rate.

The global literacy rate for all people aged 15 and above is 87.74% (2026). The global literacy rate for all males is 90.0%, and the rate for all females is 82.7%. The rate varies throughout the world, with developed nations having a rate of 99.2% (2013), South and West Asia having 70.2% (2015), and sub-Saharan Africa at 64.0% (2015). Over 75% of the world's 781 million illiterate adults are found in South Asia, West Asia, and sub-Saharan Africa, and women represent almost two-thirds of all illiterate adults globally.

== List of UN member states by age group and gender disparity ==
Data published by UNESCO using the following definitions:

Youth: Percentage of people aged 15 to 24 years who can both read and write, with understanding, a short simple statement on their everyday life. Generally, "literacy" also encompasses "numeracy", the ability to make simple arithmetic calculations.

Adult: Percentage of the population aged 25 years and over who can both read and write, with understanding, a short simple statement on their everyday life. Generally, "literacy" also encompasses "numeracy", the ability to make simple arithmetic calculations.

Elderly: Percentage of the population aged 65 years and over who can both read and write, with understanding, a short simple statement on their everyday life. Generally, "literacy" also encompasses "numeracy", the ability to make simple arithmetic calculations.

Gender Parity Index (GPI): The gender parity index (GPI) of the youth literacy rate is the ratio of the female to male literacy rates of the population aged 15 to 24 years. A GPI value between 0.97 and 1.03 is usually interpreted to indicate gender parity.

"*" indicates "Literacy in country or territory" or "Education in country or territory" links.

Country	Youth (15 to 24)		Adult (25 to 64)		Elderly (65+)		Youth Gender Parity Index	
Country	Rate	Year	Rate	Year	Rate	Year	Rate	Year
Afghanistan *	65.0	2020	31.7	2011	20.3	2011	0.5	2011
Albania *	99.2	2012	97.2	2012	86.9	2012	1.0	2012
Algeria *	93.8	2008	75.1	2008	19.5	2008	1.0	2008
American Samoa *	97.7	1980	97.3	1980	92.7	1980	1.0	1980
Andorra *								
Angola *	77.4	2014	66.0	2014	27.0	2014	0.8	2014
Anguilla *	99.1	1984	95.4	1984	88.0	1984	1.0	1984
Antigua and Barbuda *			98.9	2015				
Argentina *	99.5	2016	99.1	2016	97.9	2016	1.0	2016
Armenia *	99.8	2011	99.7	2011	98.9	2011	1.0	2011
Aruba *	99.1	2010	96.8	2010	88.9	2010	1.0	2010
Australia *	96.6							
Austria *								
Azerbaijan *	99.9	2016	99.8	2016	98.4	2016	1.0	2016
Bahamas								
Bahrain *	97.0	2001	86.5	2001	42.3	2001	1.0	2001
Bangladesh *	94.9	2019	74.7	2019	39.4	2019	1.03	2019
Barbados *	99.9	2014	99.6	2014	98.5	2014	1.0	2014
Belarus *	99.8	2009	99.6	2009	98.6	2009	1.0	2009
Belgium *								
Belize *	77.6	1991	70.3	1991	44.8	1991	1.0	1991
Benin *	52.5	2012	32.9	2012	7.0	2012	0.6	2012
Bermuda *								
Bhutan *	87.3	2012	57.0	2012	14.9	2012	0.9	2012
Bolivia *	99.4	2015	92.5	2015	67.5	2015	1.0	2015
Bonaire								
Bosnia and Herzegovina *	99.7	2013	97.0	2013	86.0	2013	1.0	2013
Botswana *	97.7	2014	87.7	2014	40.7	2014	1.0	2014
Brazil *	99.7	2020	92.0	2015	74.3	2015	1.0	2015
British Virgin Islands *								
Brunei *	99.4	2011	96.1	2011	61.6	2011	1.0	2011
Bulgaria *	97.9	2011	98.4	2011	97.5	2011	1.0	2011
Burkina Faso *	50.1	2014	34.6	2014	8.4	2014	0.8	2014
Burundi *	79.6	2014	61.6	2014	24.9	2014	0.9	2014
Cape Verde *	98.1	2015	86.8	2015	36.8	2015	1.0	2015
Cambodia *	92.2	2015	80.5	2015	53.1	2015	1.0	2015
Cameroon *	80.6	2010	71.3	2010	26.1	2010	0.9	2010
Canada *								
Cayman Islands *	98.9	2007	98.9	2007	94.7	2007	1.0	2007
Central African Republic *	36.4	2010	36.8	2010	35.7	2010	0.6	2010
Chad *	30.8	2016	22.3	2016	7.0	2016	0.6	2016
Chile *	99.4	2015	96.9	2015	89.9	2015	1.0	2015
China *	99.8	2018	96.8	2018	73.9	2010	1.0	2018
Hong Kong *								
Macau *	99.8	2016	96.5	2016	81.2	2016	1.0	2016
Colombia *	98.7	2016	94.7	2016	81.4	2016	1.0	2016
Comoros *	71.6	2012	49.2	2012	12.8	2012	0.9	2012
Congo *	80.9	2011	79.3	2011	73.1	2011	0.9	2011
DR Congo *	85.0	2016	77.0	2016	48.0	2016	0.9	2016
Cook Islands *								
Costa Rica *	99.1	2011	97.4	2011	90.4	2011	1.0	2011
Ivory Coast *	53.0	2014	43.9	2014	18.0	2014	0.8	2014
Croatia *	99.7	2011	99.1	2011	97.1	2011	1.0	2011
Cuba *	99.9	2012	99.8	2012	99.2	2012	1.0	2012
Curaçao								
Cyprus *	99.8	2011	98.7	2011	93.8	2011	1.0	2011
Czech Republic *								
Denmark *								
Djibouti *								
Dominica *								
Dominican Republic *	98.8	2016	93.8	2016	79.8	2016	1.0	2016
Ecuador *	99.1	2016	94.4	2016	77.7	2016	1.0	2016
Egypt *	93.9	2017	71.2	2017	43.2	2013	1.0	2017
El Salvador *	98.0	2016	88.5	2017	65.7	2016	1.0	2016
Equatorial Guinea *	98.2	2014	95.0	2014	67.2	2014	1.0	2014
Eritrea *	87.0	2008	64.7	2008	20.9	2008	0.9	2008
Estonia *	99.9	2011	99.9	2011	99.7	2011	1.0	2011
Eswatini *	93.5	2010	83.1	2010	45.2	2010	1.0	2010
Ethiopia *	55.0	2007	39.0	2007	13.6	2007	0.7	2007
Faroe Islands *								
Falkland Islands *								
Fiji *								
Finland *								
France *								
French Guiana *	91.3	1982	82.9	1982	69.7	1982		
French Polynesia *								
Gabon *	88.5	2012	82.3	2012	60.6	2012	1.0	2012
Gambia *	60.8	2013	42.0	2013	10.4	2013	0.9	2013
Georgia *	99.7	2014	99.6	2014	99.1	2014	1.0	2014
Germany *								
Ghana *	85.7	2010	71.5	2010	34.9	2010	0.9	2010
Gibraltar *								
Greece *	98.8	2011	97.4	2011	92.5	2011	1.0	2011
Greenland *	100.0	2015					1.0	2015
Grenada *	99.2	2014	98.6	2014	96.2	2014	1.0	2014
Guadeloupe *	99.8	2014	96.0	2014	82.9	2014	1.0	2014
Guam *	99.9	1990	99.4	1990	95.9	1990	1.0	1990
Guatemala *	94.4	2014	81.3	2014	50.7	2014	1.0	2014
Guinea *	46.3	2014	32.0	2014	13.1	2014	0.7	2014
Guinea-Bissau *	60.4	2014	45.6	2014	19.5	2014	0.7	2014
Guyana *	96.7	2014	85.6	2014	49.9	2014	1.0	2014
Haiti *	72.3	2006	48.7	2006	8.5	2006	0.9	2006
Holy See								
Honduras *	96.1	2016	89.0	2016	66.3	2016	1.0	2016
Hungary *	98.8	2014	99.1	2014	99.1	2014	1.0	2014
Iceland *								
India *	95.7	2018	75.4	2018	45.4	2018	0.97	2018
Indonesia *	99.7	2016	95.4	2016	70.1	2016	1.0	2016
Iran *	98.1	2016	85.5	2016	36.8	2016	1.0	2016
Iraq *	93.5	2017	85.6	2017	20.4	2013	0.9	2013
Ireland *								
Isle of Man *								
Israel *	98.6	1983	91.8	1983	79.8	1983	1.0	1983
Italy *	99.9	2011	98.8	2011	96.7	2011	1.0	2011
Jamaica *	96.3	2014	88.1	2014	66.6	2014	1.1	2014
Japan *								
Jordan *	99.1	2012	97.9	2012	87.7	2012	1.0	2012
Kazakhstan *	99.9	2010	99.8	2010	99.5	2010	1.0	2010
Kenya *	86.5	2014	78.7	2014	54.0	2014	1.0	2014
Kiribati *								
North Korea *	100.0	2008	100.0	2008	100.0	2008	1.0	2008
South Korea *								
Kuwait *	99.2	2017	96.1	2018	69.5	2015	1.0	2017
Kyrgyzstan *	99.8	2009	99.2	2009	92.5	2009	1.0	2009
Laos *	92.5	2015	84.7	2015	58.6	2015	1.0	2015
Latvia *	99.8	2011	99.9	2011	99.9	2011	1.0	2011
Lebanon *	99.2	2009	91.2	2009	60.2	2009	1.0	2009
Lesotho *	86.6	2014	76.6	2014	51.4	2014	1.2	2014
Liberia *	49.1	2007	42.9	2007	32.8	2007	0.6	2007
Libya *	99.6	2004	86.1	2004	24.2	2004	1.0	2004
Liechtenstein *								
Lithuania *	99.9	2011	99.8	2011	99.8	2011	1.0	2011
Luxembourg *								
Madagascar *	76.8	2012	71.6	2012	49.4	2012	1.0	2012
Malawi *	72.9	2015	62.1	2015	35.1	2015	1.0	2015
Malaysia *	98.2	2001	89.5	2001	47.1	2001	1.0	2001
Maldives *	99.3	2014	98.6	2014	92.8	2014	1.0	2014
Mali *	49.4	2015	33.1	2015	13.6	2015	0.6	2015
Malta *	98.9	2011	93.3	2011	85.8	2011	1.0	2011
Marshall Islands *	98.5	2011	98.3	2011	89.4	2011	1.0	2011
Martinique	99.8	2014	96.9	2014	88.1	2014	1.0	2014
Mauritania *	56.1	2007	45.5	2007	26.6	2007	0.7	2007
Mauritius *	98.1	2011	93.2	2016	64.6	2011	1.0	2011
Mayotte								
Mexico *	99.1	2016	94.9	2016	78.9	2016	1.0	2016
Federated States of Micronesia *								
Monaco *								
Mongolia *	98.5	2010	98.3	2010	94.6	2010	1.0	2010
Montenegro *	99.2	2011	98.4	2011	93.9	2011	1.0	2011
Montserrat *								
Morocco *	97.7	2018	73.8	2018	34.1	2018	0.99	2018
Mozambique *	70.5	2015	56.0	2015	26.0	2015	0.8	2015
Myanmar *	84.8	2016	75.6	2016	58.2	2016	1.0	2016
Namibia *	94.4	2011	88.3	2011	56.7	2011	1.0	2011
Nauru *								
Nepal *	84.8	2011	68	2018	20.8	2011	0.9	2011
Netherlands *								
New Caledonia	99.2	2014	97.8	2014	90.6	2014	1.0	2014
New Zealand *								
Nicaragua *	87.0	2005	78.0	2005	49.2	2005	1.0	2005
Niger *	39.8	2012	30.6	2012	13.7	2012	0.7	2012
Nigeria *	66.4	2008	51.1	2008	21.6	2008	0.8	2008
Niue *								
North Macedonia *	98.7	2002	96.1	2002	82.5	2002	1.0	2002
Northern Mariana Islands *								
Norway *								
Oman *	98.7	2017	96.1	2017	41.9	2016	1.0	2017
Pakistan *	74.5	2017	59.1	2017	27.1	2017	0.83	2017
Palau *	98.7	2015	96.6	2015	84.7	2015	1.0	2015
Palestine	99	2020	97	2019	63.9	2016	1.13	2016
Panama *	97.6	2010	94.1	2010	80.9	2010	1.0	2010
Papua New Guinea *	67.9	2010	61.6	2010	33.0	2010	1.1	2010
Paraguay *	98.5	2016	94.7	2016	77.8	2016	1.0	2016
Peru *	98.9	2016	94.1	2017	77.7	2016	1.0	2016
Philippines *	98.1	2013	96.4	2013	90.1	2013	1.0	2013
Pitcairn Islands								
Poland *	99.8	2008	98.7	2008	93.0	2008	1.0	2008
Portugal *	99.4	2011	94.5	2011	80.5	2011	1.0	2011
Puerto Rico *	98.8	2010	92.4	2017	84.5	2010	1.0	2010
Qatar *	95.9	2004	89.0	2004	41.0	2004	1.0	2004
Moldova *	99.5	2012	99.1	2012	95.8	2012	1.0	2012
Romania *	99.0	2011	98.6	2011	96.8	2011	1.0	2011
Russia *	99.7	2010	99.7	2010	99.2	2010	1.0	2010
Rwanda *	85.1	2014	70.8	2014	24.3	2014	1.0	2014
Réunion	95.7	1982	78.6	1982	42.0	1982	1.0	1982
Saint Helena *			96.0	1998				
Saint Kitts and Nevis *								
Saint Lucia *								
Saint Pierre and Miquelon	99.5	1982	99.3	1982	98.5	1982	1.0	1982
Saint Martin								
Samoa *	99.2	2011	99.0	2011	96.3	2011	1.0	2011
San Marino *								
São Tomé and Príncipe *	96.7	2012	90.1	2012	49.6	2012	1.0	2012
Saudi Arabia *	99.2	2013	94.4	2013	51.4	2013	1.0	2013
Senegal *	69.5	2017	51.9	2017	21.5	2013	0.8	2017
Serbia *	99.7	2016	98.8	2016	96.6	2016	1.0	2016
Seychelles	99.0	2010	94.0	2010	71.5	2010	1.0	2010
Sierra Leone *	57.0	2013	32.4	2013	3.7	2013	0.8	2013
Singapore *	99.9	2016	97.0	2016	84.0	2015	1.0	2016
Sint Maarten								
Slovakia *								
Slovenia *	99.8	2014	99.7	2014	99.3	2014	1.0	2014
Solomon Islands *			76.6	1999				
Somalia *								
South Africa *	99.0	2015	94.4	2015	72.1	2015	1.0	2015
South Sudan *	36.7	2008	26.8	2008	11.0	2008	0.7	2008
Spain *	99.6	2016	98.3	2016	94.7	2016	1.0	2016
Sri Lanka *	98.9	2017	91.9	2017	81.0	2016	1.0	2017
Saint Vincent and the Grenadines *	98.0	1970	95.6	1970	91.0	1970	1.0	1970
Sudan *	65.8	2008	53.5	2008	24.3	2008	0.9	2008
Suriname *	97.7	2012	92.9	2012	76.0	2012	1.0	2012
Svalbard and Jan Mayen								
Sweden *								
Switzerland *								
Syria *	92.5	2004	80.8	2004	39.0	2004	1.0	2004
Tajikistan *	99.9	2014	99.8	2014	98.1	2014	1.0	2014
Tanzania *	85.8	2015	77.9	2015	43.5	2015	1.0	2015
Thailand *	98.1	2015	92.9	2015	78.7	2015	1.0	2015
Timor-Leste *	79.5	2010	58.3	2010	11.2	2010	1.0	2010
Togo *	84.3	2015	63.7	2015	20.4	2015	0.9	2015
Tokelau *								
Tonga *	99.4	2011	99.4	2011	98.9	2011	1.0	2011
Trinidad and Tobago *	99.3	1990	96.9	1990	82.8	1990	1.0	1990
Tunisia *	96.2	2014	79.0	2014	39.8	2014	1.0	2014
Turkey *	99.6	2016	96.2	2016	88.1	2016	1.0	2016
Turkmenistan *	99.8	2014	99.7	2014	97.6	2014	1.0	2014
Turks and Caicos Islands								
Tuvalu *								
Uganda *	83.7	2012	70.2	2012	36.1	2012	1.0	2012
Ukraine *	100.0	2012	100.0	2012	100.0	2012	1.0	2012
United Arab Emirates *	95.0	2005	90.0	2005	42.1	2005	1.0	2005
United Kingdom *								
United States *								
U.S. Virgin Islands *								
Uruguay *	98.9	2017	98.6	2017	97.1	2016	1.0	2017
Uzbekistan *	100.0	2016	100.0	2016	99.8	2016	1.0	2016
Vanuatu *	95.3	2014	84.7	2014	44.2	2014	1.0	2014
Venezuela *	98.8	2016	97.1	2016	88.1	2016	1.0	2016
Vietnam *	97.1	2009	95.8	2019	76.9	2009	1.0	2009
Wallis and Futuna								
Western Sahara								
Yemen *	77.0	2004	54.1	2004	13.7	2004	0.7	2004
Zambia *	88.7	2010	83.0	2010	52.3	2010	0.9	2010
Zimbabwe *	90.4	2014	88.7	2014	81.1	2014	1.1	2014

== List of UN member and observer states by adult literacy rate ==
"*" indicates "Literacy in country or territory" or "Education in country or territory" links.

Country	Literacy rate				
Country	Total	Male	Female	Gender gap	Year
Afghanistan *	37.3%	52.1%	22.6%	29.5%	2021
Albania *	98.1%	98.5%	97.8%	0.7%	2018
Algeria *	81.4%	87.4%	75.3%	12.1%	2018
Andorra *	100.0%	100.0%	100.0%	0.0%	2016
Angola *	71.1%	82.0%	60.7%	21.3%	2015
Antigua and Barbuda *	99.0%	98.4%	99.4%	1.0%	2015
Argentina *	99.0%	98.9%	99.1%	0.2%	2018
Armenia *	99.8%	99.8%	99.7%	0.1%	2020
Australia *	99.0%	N/A	N/A	N/A	N/A
Austria *	98.0%	N/A	N/A	N/A	N/A
Azerbaijan *	99.8%	99.9%	99.7%	0.2%	2019
Bahamas	96.0%	N/A	N/A	N/A	N/A
Bahrain *	97.5%	99.9%	94.9%	5.0%	2018
Bangladesh *	74.66%	76.56%	72.82%	3.72%	2022
Barbados *	99.6%	99.6%	99.6%	0.0%	2014
Belarus *	99.9%	99.9%	99.9%	0.0%	2019
Belgium *	99.0%	N/A	N/A	N/A	N/A
Belize *	83.0%	N/A	N/A	N/A	N/A
Benin *	42.4%	54.0%	31.1%	22.9%	2018
Bhutan *	66.6%	75.0%	57.1%	17.9%	2017
Bolivia *	92.5%	96.5%	88.6%	7.9%	2015
Bosnia and Herzegovina *	98.5%	99.5%	97.5%	2.0%	2015
Botswana *	88.5%	88.0%	88.9%	0.9%	2015
Brazil *	93.2%	93.0%	93.4%	0.4%	2018
Brunei *	97.2%	98.1%	93.4%	4.7%	2018
Bulgaria *	98.4%	98.7%	98.1%	0.6%	2015
Burkina Faso *	39.3%	49.2%	31.0%	18.2%	2018
Burundi *	68.4%	76.3%	61.2%	15.1%	2017
Cape Verde *	86.8%	91.7%	82.0%	9.7%	2015
Cambodia *	80.5%	86.5%	75.0%	11.5%	2015
Cameroon *	77.1%	82.6%	71.6%	11.0%	2018
Canada *	99.0%	N/A	N/A	N/A	N/A
Central African Republic *	37.4%	49.5%	25.8%	23.7%	2018
Chad *	30.63%	44.52%	18.64%	25.88%	2019
Chile *	96.3%	96.3%	96.3%	0.0%	2017
China *	96.8%	98.5%	95.2%	3.3%	2018
Colombia *	95.6%	95.4%	95.9%	0.5%	2020
Comoros *	58.8%	64.6%	53.0%	11.6%	2018
Congo *	80.3%	86.1%	74.6%	11.5%	2018
DR Congo *	77.0%	88.5%	66.5%	22.0%	2016
Costa Rica *	97.9%	97.8%	97.9%	0.1%	2018
Ivory Coast *	89.9%	93.1%	86.7%	6.4%	2019
Croatia *	99.3%	99.7%	98.9%	0.8%	2015
Cuba *	99.8%	99.9%	99.8%	0.1%	2015
Cyprus *	99.1%	99.5%	98.7%	0.8%	2015
Czech Republic *	99.0%	99.0%	99.0%	0.0%	2011
Denmark *	99.0%	N/A	N/A	N/A	N/A
Djibouti *	N/A	N/A	N/A	N/A	N/A
Dominica *	92.0%	N/A	N/A	N/A	N/A
Dominican Republic *	93.8%	93.8%	93.8%	0.0%	2016
Ecuador *	93.6%	94.8%	92.5%	2.3%	2020
Egypt *	71.2%	76.5%	65.5%	11.0%	2017
El Salvador *	89.1%	91.3%	87.3%	4.0%	2019
Equatorial Guinea *	95.3%	97.4%	93.0%	4.4%	2015
Eritrea *	76.6%	84.4%	68.9%	15.5%	2018
Estonia *	99.8%	99.8%	99.8%	0.0%	2015
Eswatini *	88.4%	88.3%	88.5%	0.2%	2018
Ethiopia *	51.8%	57.2%	44.4%	12.8%	2017
Fiji *	99.1%	99.1%	99.1%	0.0%	2018
Finland *	100.0%	N/A	N/A	N/A	N/A
France *	99.0%	N/A	N/A	N/A	N/A
Gabon *	84.7%	85.9%	83.4%	2.5%	2018
Gambia *	50.8%	61.8%	41.6%	20.2%	2015
Georgia *	99.6%	99.7%	99.5%	0.2%	2019
Germany *	99.0%	N/A	N/A	N/A	N/A
Ghana *	79.0%	83.5%	74.5%	9.0%	2018
Greece *	97.9%	98.5%	97.4%	1.1%	2018
Grenada *	98.6%	98.6%	98.6%	0.0%	2014
Guatemala *	80.8%	85.3%	76.7%	8.6%	2018
Guinea *	39.6%	54.4%	27.7%	26.7%	2018
Guinea-Bissau *	59.9%	71.8%	48.3%	23.5%	2015
Guyana *	88.5%	87.2%	89.8%	2.6%	2015
Haiti *	61.7%	65.3%	58.3%	7.0%	2016
Honduras *	88.5%	88.2%	88.7%	0.5%	2019
Hungary *	99.1%	99.1%	99.0%	0.1%	2015
Iceland *	99.0%	N/A	N/A	N/A	N/A
India *	74.4%	82.4%	65.8%	16.6%	2018
Indonesia *	96.0%	97.4%	94.6%	2.8%	2020
Iran *	85.5%	90.4%	80.8%	9.6%	2016
Iraq *	85.6%	91.2%	79.9%	11.3%	2017
Ireland *	99.0%	N/A	N/A	N/A	N/A
Israel *	97.8%	98.7%	96.8%	1.9%	2011
Italy *	99.2%	99.4%	99.0%	0.4%	2018
Jamaica *	88.7%	84.0%	93.1%	9.1%	2015
Japan *	99.0%	N/A	N/A	N/A	N/A
Jordan *	98.2%	98.6%	97.8%	0.8%	2018
Kazakhstan *	99.8%	99.8%	99.7%	0.1%	2018
Kenya *	81.5%	85.0%	78.2%	6.8%	2018
Kiribati *	98.63%	98.63%	98.95%	-0.32%	2020
North Korea *	100.0%	100.0%	100.0%	0.0%	2015
South Korea *	97.97%	98.32%	97.62%	0.70%	2008
Kuwait *	96.5%	97.1%	95.4%	1.7%	2020
Kyrgyzstan *	99.6%	99.7%	99.5%	0.2%	2018
Laos *	84.7%	90.0%	79.4%	10.6%	2015
Latvia *	99.9%	99.9%	99.9%	0.0%	2018
Lebanon *	95.1%	96.9%	93.3%	3.6%	2018
Lesotho *	79.4%	70.1%	88.3%	18.2%	2015
Liberia *	48.3%	62.7%	34.1%	28.6%	2017
Libya *	91.0%	96.7%	85.6%	11.1%	2015
Liechtenstein *	100.0%	N/A	N/A	N/A	N/A
Lithuania *	99.8%	99.8%	99.8%	0.0%	2015
Luxembourg *	100.0%	N/A	N/A	N/A	N/A
Madagascar *	76.7%	78.4%	75.1%	3.3%	2018
Malawi *	62.1%	69.8%	55.2%	14.6%	2015
Malaysia *	95.0%	96.2%	93.6%	2.6%	2019
Maldives *	97.7%	97.3%	98.1%	0.8%	2016
Mali *	35.5%	46.2%	25.7%	20.5%	2018
Malta *	94.5%	93.0%	96.0%	3.0%	2018
Marshall Islands *	98.3%	98.3%	98.2%	0.1%	2011
Mauritania *	53.5%	63.7%	43.4%	20.3%	2017
Mauritius *	91.3%	93.4%	89.4%	4.0%	2018
Mexico *	95.2%	96.1%	94.5%	1.6%	2020
Federated States of Micronesia *	99.0%	N/A	N/A	N/A	N/A
Moldova *	99.4%	99.7%	99.1%	0.6%	2015
Monaco *	99.0%	N/A	N/A	N/A	N/A
Mongolia *	99.2%	99.1%	99.2%	0.1%	2020
Montenegro *	98.8%	99.5%	98.3%	1.2%	2018
Morocco *	73.8%	83.3%	64.6%	18.7%	2018
Mozambique *	60.7%	72.6%	50.3%	22.3%	2017
Myanmar *	89.1%	92.4%	86.3%	6.1%	2019
Namibia *	91.5%	91.6%	91.4%	0.2%	2018
Nauru *	95.0%	N/A	N/A	N/A	N/A
Nepal *	67.9%	78.6%	59.7%	18.9%	2018
Netherlands *	99.0%	N/A	N/A	N/A	N/A
New Zealand *	99.0%	N/A	N/A	N/A	N/A
Nicaragua *	82.6%	82.4%	82.8%	0.4%	2015
Niger *	35.51%	47.89%	25.69%	22.20%	2022
Nigeria *	62.0%	71.3%	52.7%	18.6%	2018
North Macedonia *	98.4%	99.1%	97.6%	1.5%	2020
Norway *	100.0%	N/A	N/A	N/A	N/A
Oman *	95.7%	97.0%	92.7%	4.3%	2018
Pakistan *	58.0%	69.3%	46.5%	22.8%	2019
Palau *	100.0%	100.0%	100.0%	0%	2020
Panama *	95.7%	98.8%	95.4%	3.4%	2019
Papua New Guinea *	64.2%	65.6%	62.8%	2.8%	2015
Paraguay *	94.5%	94.9%	94.2%	0.7%	2020
Peru *	94.5%	97.0%	92.0%	5.0%	2020
Philippines *	96.3%	95.7%	96.9%	1.2%	2019
Poland *	99.8%	99.9%	99.7%	0.2%	2015
Portugal *	96.1%	97.4%	95.1%	2.3%	2018
Palestine	97%	99%	96%	3%	2019
Qatar *	93.5%	92.4%	94.7%	2.3%	2017
Romania *	98.8%	99.1%	98.6%	0.5%	2018
Russia *	99.93%	99.92%	99.94%	-0.02%	2021
Rwanda *	73.2%	77.6%	69.4%	8.2%	2018
Saint Kitts and Nevis *	97.0%	N/A	N/A	N/A	N/A
Saint Lucia *	90.0%	N/A	N/A	N/A	N/A
Saint Vincent and the Grenadines *	96.0%	N/A	N/A	N/A	N/A
Samoa *	99.1%	99.0%	99.2%	0.2%	2018
San Marino *	99.91%	99.9%	99.93%	-0.03%	2022
São Tomé and Príncipe *	92.8%	96.2%	89.5%	6.7%	2018
Saudi Arabia *	97.6%	98.6%	96.0%	2.6%	2020
Senegal *	51.9%	64.8%	39.8%	25.0%	2017
Serbia *	99.5%	99.9%	99.1%	0.8%	2019
Seychelles	95.9%	95.4%	96.4%	1.0%	2018
Sierra Leone *	43.2%	51.6%	39.8%	11.8%	2018
Singapore *	97.5%	98.9%	96.1%	2.8%	2019
Slovakia *	100.0%	N/A	N/A	N/A	N/A
Slovenia *	99.7%	99.7%	99.7%	0.0%	2015
Solomon Islands *	77.0%	N/A	N/A	N/A	N/A
Somalia *	39.0%	N/A	N/A	N/A	N/A
South Africa *	95.0%	95.5%	94.5%	1.0%	2019
South Sudan *	34.5%	40.3%	28.9%	11.4%	2018
Spain *	98.6%	99.0%	98.2%	0.8%	2020
Sri Lanka *	92.3%	93.0%	91.6%	1.4%	2019
Sudan *	60.7%	65.4%	56.1%	9.3%	2018
Suriname *	94.4%	96.1%	92.7%	3.4%	2018
Sweden *	99.0%	N/A	N/A	N/A	N/A
Switzerland *	99.0%	N/A	N/A	N/A	N/A
Syria *	86.4%	91.7%	81.0%	10.7%	2015
Taiwan *	98.70%	99.73%	97.69%	2.05%	2017
Tajikistan *	99.8%	99.8%	99.7%	0.1%	2015
Tanzania *	77.9%	83.2%	73.1%	10.1%	2015
Thailand *	93.8%	95.2%	92.4%	2.8%	2018
Timor-Leste *	68.1%	71.9%	64.2%	7.7%	2018
Togo *	66.5%	80.0%	55.1%	24.9%	2019
Tonga *	99.4%	99.4%	99.5%	0.1%	2018
Trinidad and Tobago *	99.0%	99.2%	98.7%	0.5%	2015
Tunisia *	81.8%	89.6%	74.2%	15.4%	2015
Turkey *	96.7%	99.1%	94.4%	4.7%	2019
Turkmenistan *	99.9%	99.9%	99.9%	0.0%	2022
Tuvalu *	100.0%	100.0%	100.0%	0%	2022
Uganda *	76.5%	82.7%	70.8%	11.9%	2018
Ukraine *	99.8%	99.8%	99.7%	0.1%	2015
United Arab Emirates *	97.6%	98.0%	96.9%	1.1%	2019
United Kingdom *	99.0%	N/A	N/A	N/A	N/A
United States *	99.0%	N/A	N/A	N/A	N/A
Uruguay *	98.8%	98.5%	99.0%	0.5%	2019
Uzbekistan *	100.0%	100.0%	100.0%	0.0%	2019
Vanuatu *	87.5%	88.3%	86.7%	1.6%	2018
Venezuela *	97.1%	97.0%	97.2%	0.2%	2016
Vietnam *	95.8%	97.0%	94.6%	2.4%	2019
Yemen *	70.1%	85.1%	55.0%	30.1%	2015
Zambia *	86.7%	90.6%	83.1%	7.5%	2018
Zimbabwe *	86.5%	88.5%	84.6%	3.9%	2015
World	86.7%	90.1%	83.3%	6.8%	2020

== List of other states and territories ==
Territory	Literacy rate (all)	Male literacy	Female literacy	Gender difference (Note: A positive value indicates that the male literacy rate is higher. A negative value indicates that the female literacy rate is higher.)	Year	Note
Aruba	97.5%	97.5%	97.5%	0.0%	2015	A constituent country of the Kingdom of the Netherlands.
Cayman Islands	98.9%	98.7%	99.0%	−0.3%	2007	An overseas territory of the United Kingdom.
Guadeloupe	96.5%	96.4%	96.6%	−0.2%	2015	Overseas region/department of France.
Guam	99.8%	99.8%	99.8%	0.0%	2015	An unincorporated and organized territory of the United States.
Kosovo	91.9%	96.6%	87.5%	9.1%	2003	Member of two UN specialized agencies (World Bank Group and International Monetary Fund). It is claimed by Serbia.
Macau	96.2%	98.0%	94.6%	3.4%	2015	A special administrative region of China.
Martinique	97.0%	97.6%	96.4%	1.2%	2015	Overseas region/department of France.
New Caledonia	96.9%	97.3%	96.5%	0.8%	2015	Overseas region/department of France.
Puerto Rico	93.3%	92.8%	93.8%	−1.0%	2015	Unincorporated territory of the United States.
Réunion	93.9%	93.2%	94.5%	−1.3%	2015	Overseas region/department of France.

== See also ==
- Compulsory education
- International Literacy Day
- List of Brazilian states by literacy rate
- List of Indian states and union territories by literacy rate
- Programme for International Student Assessment, which focuses on developed countries
- Programme for the International Assessment of Adult Competencies
- Progress in International Reading Literacy Study
- Universal access to education
