= List of education articles by country =

This is a list of articles on education organized by country:

== A ==
- Education in Abkhazia
- Education in Afghanistan
- Education in Albania
- Education in Algeria
- Education in Angola
- Education in Andorra
- Education in Antigua and Barbuda
- Education in American Samoa
- Education in Argentina
- Education in Armenia
- Education in Australia
- Education in Austria
- Education in Azerbaijan

== B ==
- Education in the Bahamas
- Education in Bahrain
- Education in Bangladesh
- Education in Barbados
- Education in Belarus
- Education in Belgium
- Education in Belize
- Education in Benin
- Education in Bhutan
- Education in Bolivia
- Education in Bosnia and Herzegovina
- Education in Botswana
- Education in Brazil
- Education in Brunei
- Education in Bulgaria
- Education in Burkina Faso
- Education in Burundi

== C ==
- Education in Cambodia
- Education in Cameroon
- Education in Canada
  - Education in Alberta
  - Education in Ontario
  - Education in Québec
  - History of education in Canada
- Education in Cape Verde
- Education in the Central African Republic
- Education in Chad
- Education in Chile
- Education in China
  - History of education in China
  - Education in Hong Kong
  - Education in Macau
  - Education in Tibet
- Education in Christmas Islands
- Education in Cocos Islands
- Education in Colombia
- Education in Comoros
- Education in the Democratic Republic of the Congo
- Education in the Republic of the Congo
- Education in the Cook Islands
- Education in Costa Rica
- Education in Côte d'Ivoire
- Education in Croatia
- Education in Cuba
- Education in Cyprus
- Education in the Czech Republic
- Education in Czechoslovakia (historical)

== D ==
- Education in Denmark
- Education in Dominica
- Education in the Dominican Republic
- Education in Djibouti

== E ==
- Education in Ecuador
- Education in Egypt
- Education in El Salvador
- Education in England
- Education in Equatorial Guinea
- Education in Eritrea
- Education in Estonia
- Education in Eswatini
- Education in Ethiopia

== F ==
- Education in Fiji
- Education in Finland
- Education in France

== G ==
- Education in Gabon
- Education in the Gambia
- Education in Georgia
- Education in Germany
  - Education in East Germany (historical)
- Education in Ghana
- Education in Guinea
- Education in Guinea-Bissau
- Education in Greece
- Education in Grenada
- Education in Guyana
- Education in Guam
- Education in Guatemala

== H ==
- Education in Haiti
- Education in Hawaii
- Education in Honduras
- Education in Hungary
- Education in Hong Kong

== I ==
- Education in Iceland
- Education in India
  - History of education in the Indian subcontinent
- Education in Indonesia
- Education in Iran
- Education in Iraq
- Education in Ireland
- Education in Israel
- Education in Italy

== J ==
- Education in Japan
- Education in Jamaica
- Education in Jordan

== K ==
- Education in Kazakhstan
- Education in Kenya
- Education in Kiribati
- Education in Korea
  - Education in North Korea
  - Education in South Korea
- Education in Kosovo
- Education in Kuwait
- Education in Kyrgyzstan

== L ==
- Education in Laos
- Education in Latvia
- Education in Lebanon
- Education in Lesotho
- Education in Liberia
- Education in Libya
- Education in Liechtenstein
- Education in Lithuania
- Education in Luxembourg

== M ==
- Education in Macau
- Education in Madagascar
- Education in Malawi
- Education in Malaysia
- Education in the Maldives
- Education in Mali
- Education in Malta
- Education in the Marshall Islands
- Education in Mauritania
- Education in Mauritius
- Education in Mexico
- Education in Micronesia
- Education in Moldova
- Education in Monaco
- Education in Mongolia
- Education in Montenegro
- Education in Morocco
- Education in Mozambique
- Education in Myanmar
  - Education in Burma

== N ==
- Education in Namibia
- Education in Nauru
- Education in Nepal
- Education in the Netherlands
  - Education in Aruba
  - Education in Curaçao
  - Education in Sint Maarten
- Education in New Zealand
- Education in Nicaragua
- Education in Niger
- Education in Nigeria
- Education in Niue
- Education in North Macedonia
- Education in Northern Cyprus
- Education in Northern Ireland
- Education in Norway

== O ==
- Education in Oman

== P ==
- Education in Pakistan
- Education in Palau
- Education in Palestine
- Education in Panama
- Education in Papua New Guinea
- Education in Paraguay
- Education in Peru
- Education in the Philippines
- Education in Poland
  - Underground Education in Poland During World War II (historical)
  - Education in the People's Republic of Poland (historical)
- Education in Portugal

== Q ==
- Education in Qatar

== R ==
- Education in Romania
- Education in Russia
- Education in Rwanda

== S ==
- Education in Saint Kitts and Nevis
- Education in Saint Lucia
- Education in Saint Vincent and the Grenadines
- Education in São Tomé and Príncipe
- Education in San Marino
- Education in Samoa
- Education in Saudi Arabia
- Education in Scotland
- Education in Senegal
- Education in Serbia
- Education in Seychelles
- Education in Sierra Leone
- Education in Singapore
- Education in Slovakia
- Education in Slovenia
- Education in Solomon Islands
- Education in Somalia
  - Education in Somaliland
- Education in South Africa
- Education in South Sudan
- Education in the Soviet Union (historical)
- Education in Spain
  - Education in Catalonia
- Education in Sri Lanka
- Education in Sudan
- Education in Suriname
- Education in Sweden
- Education in Switzerland
- Education in Syria

== T ==
- Education in Taiwan
- Education in Tajikistan
- Education in Tanzania
- Education in Thailand
- Education in Timor-Leste
- Education in Tokelau
- Education in Togo
- Education in Tonga
- Education in Trinidad and Tobago
- Education in Tunisia
- Education in Turkey
- Education in Turkmenistan
- Education in Tuvalu

== U ==
- Education in Uganda
- Education in Ukraine
- Education in the United Arab Emirates
- Education in the United Kingdom
  - Education in Anguilla
  - Education in Bermuda
  - Education in the British Virgin Islands
  - Education in the Cayman Islands
  - Education in England
    - History of education in England
  - Education in Northern Ireland
  - Education in Scotland
  - Education in Wales
    - History of education in Wales
- Education in the United States
  - History of education in the United States
  - Education in Puerto Rico
- Education in Uganda
- Education in Uruguay
- Education in Uzbekistan

== V ==
- Education in Vanuatu
- Education in Vatican City
- Education in Venezuela
- Education in Vietnam

== Y ==
- Education in Yemen

== Z ==
- Education in Zambia
- Education in Zimbabwe

== See also ==
- List of basic education topics
- Compulsory education
- Outline of education
- Progressive education
- Human rights education
- Education for sustainable development
