= Education in Georgia =

Education in Georgia may refer to:

- Education in Georgia (country)
- Education in Georgia (U.S. state)
