= Hirur =

- Village
- Country: India
- State: Karnataka
- District: Belgaum

Languages
  - Official: Kannada
- Time zone: UTC+5:30 (IST)
- ISO 3166 code: IN-KA

Hirur is a village in Belgaum district in the southern state of Karnataka, India.

It has a population of 3031, including 608 families and 430 aged between 0 and 6.

Hirur's literacy rate is 64.36%

Hirur working industry

Main Workers	880	659	221
Cultivators	219	205	14
Agriculture Labourer	319	173	146
Household Industries	17	17	0
Other Workers	325	264	61
Marginal Workers	379	188	191
Non Working	1,772	671	1,101

Hirur on a map of India
