= Turkmen National Conservatory =

Music conservatory in Ashgabat, Turkmenistan

- Maýa Kulyýewa adyndaky Türkmen milli konserwatoriýasy
- Type: State music conservatory
- Established: 1993
- Location: Ashgabat, Turkmenistan
- Website: tmk.edu.tm

Turkmen National Conservatory (Turkmen: Maýa Kulyýewa adyndaky Türkmen milli konserwatoriýasy; Russian: Туркменская национальная консерватория имени Маи Кулиевой) is a music conservatory in Ashgabat, Turkmenistan. Based on the decree № 1403 of the President of Turkmenistan from June 2, 1993, Ashgabat State Conservatory was transformed into Turkmen National Conservatory (TNC). Now TNC is one of the leading institutions of higher education in the country. Turkmen National Conservatory is under the direct patronage of the Ministry of Culture and Broadcasting of Turkmenistan.

== History ==
Institution was opened in 1972 in the Ashkhabad, Turkmen SSR under the name of the Turkmen State Institute of Pedagogical Art (Türkmen döwlet mugallymçylyk sungat instituty). In those years, the institute included the faculties of art, music teacher, cultural education and history of music, theory and composition, special and general piano, singing alone, general vocal and conducting, orchestra and folk musical instruments. Departments of social sciences functioned. According to this decision, the Ashgabat State Conservatory is part of the Faculty of Arts and the Faculty of Music.

In accordance with the Decree of the highly esteemed President of Turkmenistan on September 9, 1992, the Ashgabat State Conservatory and the Turkmen State Institute of Culture were established on the basis of the Turkmen State Institute of Pedagogical Art.

In 1993, the Ashgabat State Conservatory was renamed the Turkmen National Conservatory (Türkmen milli konserwatoriýasy). At the same time, the Danatar Ovezov Turkmen State Musical College and a Special Musical Boarding School passed into her subordination.

In March 2019, by the Decree of the Mejlis of Turkmenistan — the Turkmen National Conservatory it was named after Maya Kuliyeva. In October 2019, the Museum of Maya Kuliyeva was opened on the territory of the Turkmen National Conservatory.

== Structure ==
The Conservatory consists of 4 academic divisions and 15 departments along with administrative office, academic office, concert office, human resources section, maintenance section, financial office, ethnic music research lab, acoustic lab, computer lab, restoration of national music instruments lab, library and manuscripts archive.

== Academics ==
Program length at Turkmen National Conservatory is 5 years. After completion graduates of TNC obtain a Diploma of Higher Education which is comparable to US Bachelor's degree.

== Divisions and departments ==
=== Instrumental Performance ===
Departments:

- Turkmen Music
- Folk Instruments
- Piano
- String Instruments
- Wind and Percussion Instruments
- Popular Music

=== Vocal Arts ===
Departments:

- Voice Art
- Bakshy
- Opera Art

=== Conducting ===
Departments:

- Choral Conducting
- Orchestral Conducting
- Music Pedagogy

=== Composition and Musicology ===
Departments:

- Music Theory
- Composition
- Theory of Turkmen Ethnic and Folk Music

== Academic approach ==
The Philosophy of Turkmen National Conservatory is to maintain and to cultivate national traditions. Also a lot of attention is directed towards studying and practicing classical music from around the World, and applying adapted knowledge into academic and artistic performance of the Conservatory.
