= Literacy in Somalia =

Somalia is a nation on the Horn of Africa with a population of approximately 18 million people. As of 2022, the country has an adult literacy rate (Note: Defined as the percentage of people ages 15 and above who can both read and write with understanding a short simple statement about their everyday life.) of about 41%. There is a significant gender disparity in literacy rate, with 54% of men and only 22% of women being literate. According to USAID, the youth literacy rate (Note: Defined as the percentage of the population aged 15–24 who can read and write.) is approximately 70%. The official languages of Somalia are Somali and Arabic, with English and Italian used as well.

== History ==
The Siad Barre government initiated large-scale public works programs in 1972, and successfully implemented an urban and rural literacy campaign, thus significantly increasing the literacy rate. By the end of the program, literacy rate in Somalia was reported to be at 80% due to the massive success of this campaign. In 1975 the Somali ministry of education was awarded a UNESCO prize

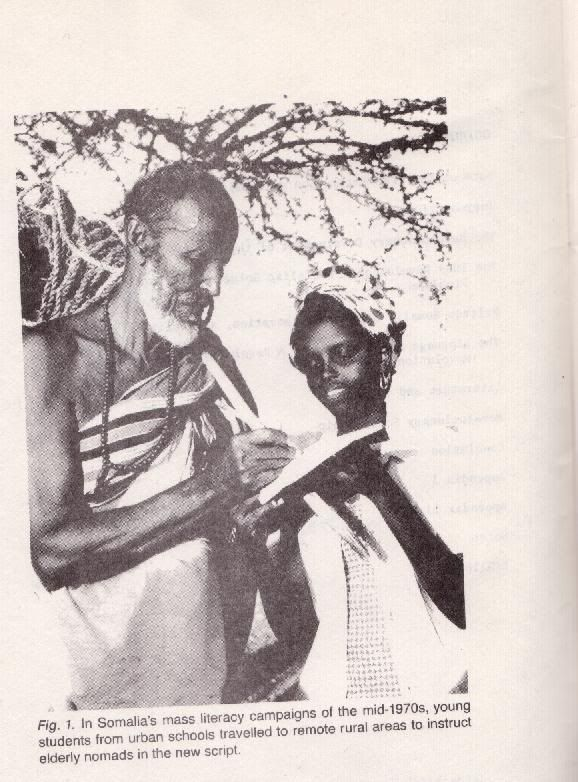
Rural Somali literacy program

Former US ambassador to Somalia praised Somali literacy efforts:

''UNESCO reportedly examined this and found that when Somalis closed down the schools for two years and sent everybody to the field with chalk and blackboards and radio receivers, that they did, in a period of five years, go from a 12-16% literacy rate to an 86% literacy rate. The Somalis that I know, having been back four times since retirement, and having the privilege of traveling anywhere in the country, would say it certainly is well over 50%. Exactly how high it is, I have no way of judging. But I think it is one of the most remarkable achievements of any country in Africa.''

According to a World Bank education survey on Somalia conducted in the 1970s, the expansion of education during this period was described as outstanding. The report estimated the national literacy rate at approximately 60%, reflecting the dramatic gains achieved through the Siad Barre government's mass literacy campaign of 1973–1975, which mobilized secondary school students across rural and urban areas to deliver instruction in the newly codified Somali script.

UNESCO assessments at the time indicated that Ethiopia’s literacy efforts were less impressive than those in Somalia; the literacy rate in Ethiopia was recorded at a low of 3.5%. Following 1974, Kiflu Tadesse writes that Ethiopia copied literacy campaigns and related state-building measures of Siad Barre in Somalia.

== Modern Literacy ==
Education in Somalia is not widespread today, with nearly 85% of children not enrolled in school according to USAID. The nation has a lower secondary education completion rate of 19.5%. Somalia's relatively poor education and low literacy rates have largely been attributed to the effects of the ongoing Somali Civil War, which began around 1991. Despite this, the current adult literacy rate of 41%
