= List of Brazilian states by literacy rate =

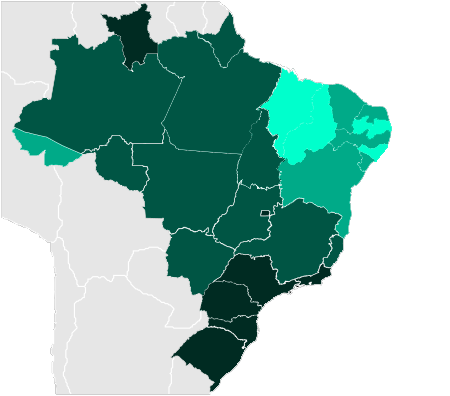
Literacy rate in Brazilian states (2022) 96.5-100% 95.5-96.49 90.5-95.49 88-90.49

This article is a list of Brazilian states by literacy rate.

== List ==
Rank	State	Literacy (%)
1	Rio de Janeiro	99.3
2	Santa Catarina	99.2
3	Rio Grande do Sul	98.5
4	São Paulo	98.4
5	Distrito Federal	98.1
6	Amapá	96.7
7	Paraná	96.6
8	Espírito Santo	96.5
9	Minas Gerais	96.4
10	Mato Grosso do Sul	96.3
11	Goiás	96.3
11	Mato Grosso	96.3
13	Roraima	96.0
14	Rondônia	95.9
15	Amazonas	95.6
16	Rio Grande do Norte	95.0
–	Brazil	94.70
17	Pará	93.9
18	Tocantins	93.9
19	Pernambuco	93.2
20	Bahia	92.8
21	Acre	92.0
22	Sergipe	90.8
23	Ceará	90.6
24	Paraíba	90.4
25	Maranhão	89.5
26	Piauí	89.1
27	Alagoas	88.6
