= Literacy in South Korea =

Literacy in South Korea refers to the ability to read, write, and interpret written information within linguistic, social, and digital contexts. International assessments place South Korea among OECD countries with high reported literacy levels, which has been discussed in relation to compulsory education and national curriculum frameworks. In recent years, literacy policy discussions have focused on digital media literacy, learning gaps among students, and the educational impact of the COVID-19 pandemic. Government-led curriculum revisions and learning-support systems have played a central role in addressing these issues.

== Definition of literacy ==
UNESCO defines literacy as "the ability to find, understand, interpret, create, communicate, and calculate information using printed and written materials related to various contexts."

In academic discussions, literacy is often distinguished beyond basic reading skills. Hwang Hye-jin (2015) differentiates between basic literacy and higher-order literacy, defining the latter as the ability to interpret, analyze, and evaluate texts across varying lengths.

Ryu Soo-yeol (2009) emphasizes the social dimension of literacy, describing it as the capacity to "read and write the world," highlighting the role of context in language use and meaning-making.

== Literacy in South Korea ==
=== Linguistic characteristics ===
Studies on Korean language use have examined the role of Sino-Korean vocabulary, foreign languages, and digital language environments in discussions of literacy.

=== Adult literacy proficiency and international comparison ===
According to the OECD Survey of Adult Skills (PIAAC) 2023, adult literacy in South Korea is measured in terms of literacy proficiency rather than a simple literacy rate. Adults aged 16–65 in South Korea scored an average of 249 points in literacy proficiency, which is below the OECD average. Approximately 31% of Korean adults scored at or below Level 1, indicating low literacy proficiency, compared with an OECD average of 26%. Only about 6% of adults in South Korea reached the highest proficiency levels (Levels 4–5). The results also show a significant gap between age groups, with older adults demonstrating lower literacy proficiency than younger cohorts. These findings highlight that, despite high levels of formal education, disparities in adult literacy skills remain when compared internationally.

== Government Policies and Programs ==
=== 2022 revised national curriculum ===
Under the 2022 revised national curriculum, Korean language instructional hours for first- and second-grade elementary school students increased from 448 to 482 hours. The curriculum revision also introduced play-based learning approaches in early grades.

In addition, a "media" domain was added to the existing curriculum areas of listening/speaking, reading, writing, grammar, and literature, reflecting expanded attention to digital and media-related language use.

=== Learning support systems in South Korea ===
Support systems for students with low academic performance in South Korea have developed through several stages.

- 1980–2000: Teacher-Centered Support System

During this period, national-level initiatives focused on the development of instructional materials for students experiencing academic difficulties. Early studies, including Park Sung-ik (1984), examined remediation approaches. In 1997, the Ministry of Education introduced a student responsibility guidance system.

- 2001–2010: School-Centered Support System

The Ministry of Education's National Human Resource Development Basic Plan emphasized guaranteed basic education and expanded the Basic Academic Responsibility Guidance System. Schools introduced supplementary teaching staff and study room programs.

- 2011–Present: Multi-Support System

More recent approaches have included cooperation with civic organizations and the expansion of tutoring programs targeting students with persistent learning difficulties.

The following table summarizes the development of learning support policies in South Korea.

Period	Policy characteristics	Key features
1980–2000	Teacher-centered support	Development of learning-support materials; early remediation research
2001–2010	School-centered system	Basic Academic Responsibility Guidance System; supplementary teachers; study rooms
2011–present	Multi-support system	Collaboration with civic organizations; expanded tutoring programs

== Challenges and debates ==
Despite high overall literacy levels, ongoing discussions in South Korea address disparities in learning outcomes, the interpretation of digital and media texts, and educational inequality exacerbated during the COVID-19 pandemic. Academic and policy debates continue regarding how literacy should be defined and measured in increasingly digital learning environments.

== See also ==
- National Library of Korea
- National Library for Children and Young Adults
- Korean Library Association
