= Literacy in Canada =

Literacy is a skill valued by the Canadian government, who as of 2007 administers efforts to improve literacy via Employment and Social Development Canada's Office of Literacy and Essential Skills. The OECD's Programme for the International Assessment of Adult Competencies reported in 2021 that nearly half of Canadians are below a high school level of assessment.

== History ==
=== Colonialism (1600s–1762) ===
Research on the literacy rates of Canadians in the colonial days rests largely on examination of the ratio of signatures to marks on parish acts (birth, baptismal, and marriage registrations). Although some researchers have concluded that signature counts drawn from marriage registers in 19th-century France corresponded closely with literacy tests given to military conscripts, others regard this methodology as a "relatively unimaginative treatment of the complex practices and events that might be described as literacy." However, censuses dating back to 1666 and official records from New France offer few clues of their own on the population's levels of literacy, therefore leaving few options in terms of materials from which to draw literary rate estimates.

In his research of literacy rates among adult males and females in New France, Trudel found that in 1663, of the 1,224 married people in New France, 59% of grooms and 46% of brides signed their names. However, less than 40% of the over 3,000 colony inhabitants were native-born, and thus the signature rates likely reflected literacy rates in France rather than in New France. Magnuson's research revealed a trend: signature rates for the period of 1680–1699 were 42% for males and 30% for females; in 1657–1715, they were 45% for males and 43% for females; in 1745–1754, they were higher for females than for males. He believed that this upward trend in women's ability to sign documents was largely attributed to the greater number of female religious orders and to the proportionately more active role of women in health and education; male religious orders largely served as parish priests, missionaries, military chaplains, and explorers. Canada's first newspaper—the Halifax Gazette—began publication in 1752.

=== From the British Conquest (1763) to Confederation (1867) ===
The end of the Seven Years' War in 1763 allowed Québec City to acquire two Philadelphia printers and begin printing a bilingual Quebec Chronicle-Telegraph in 1764, and in 1785 Fleury Mesplet started publication of the Montreal Gazette, which is now the oldest continuing newspaper in the country.

In the 19th century, printing became more affordable, and literature, in its many forms, became much more available. Nevertheless, educating the Canadian population in reading and writing was still a challenge. Concerned about the strong French Canadian presence in the colony, the British authorities repeatedly tried to help establish schools that were outside the control of religious authorities, but these efforts were largely undermined by the Catholic Church and later the Anglican clergy.

Starting in the early 1820s in Lower Canada, the classical college curriculum, which was controlled by the Church, was subject to growing criticism, with people saying it was primarily fit to produce priests at a time when Lower Canadians were competing with "foreign industry and commerce and with the immigrants who were monopolizing trade." Catholic and later Anglican responses to attempts to promote parish schools centered around "the dangers of popular literacy" both opposed a curriculum that encouraged lay reading of the Bible and "warned of the evil and demoralizing tendencies of unregulated reading in general."

Despite this, the invention of the printing press had laid the foundations for the modern era and universal social literacy, and thus, with time, "technologically, literacy had passed from the hands of an elite to the populace at large. Historical factors and sociopolitical conditions, however, have determined the extent to which universal social literacy has come to pass."

=== 1868–1986 ===
In 1871, only about half of French Canadian men self-reported that they were literate, whereas 90 percent of other Canadian men said they could read and write. Information from the Canadian Families Project sample of the 1901 Census in Canada indicated that literacy rates for French Canadians and other Canadians had increased, as measured by the ability of men between the ages of 16 and 65 to answer literacy questions. Compulsory attendance in schools was legislated in the late 19th century in all provinces but Quebec, but by then, a change in parental attitudes towards education meant that many children were already attending regularly. Unlike school promoters' emphasis on character formation, the shaping of values, the development of political and social attitudes, and proper behavior, many parents supported schooling because they wanted their children to learn to read, write, and do arithmetic. Efforts were made to exert power and religious, moral, economic/professional, and social/cultural influence over children who were learning to read by dictating the contents of their school readers, but educators broke from these influences and also taught literature from a more child-centered perspective: reading for the pleasure of it.

Educational change in Québec began as a result of a major inquiry at the start of the "Quiet Revolution" in the early 1960s. In response to the resulting recommendations, the Québec government revamped the school system in an attempt to enhance the francophone population's general educational level and produce a better-qualified labor force. Catholic Church leadership was rejected in favor of government administration, and vastly increased budgets were given to school boards across the province.

With time and with continuing inquiry into the literacy achievement levels of Canadians, the definition of literacy moved from a dichotomous one (either a person could, or could not, write their name, or was literate or illiterate) to one that considered literacy's multidimensionality, along with the qualitative and quantitative aspects of literacy. In the 1970s, organizations like the Canadian Association for Adult Education believed that one had to complete the 8th grade to achieve functional literacy. Examination of 1976 census data found that among Canadians age 15 or over, 4,376,655, or 28.4%, reported a level of schooling of less than grade 9 and were thus deemed not functionally literate. However, in 1991, UNESCO formally stated that Canada's use of educational attainment as a proxy measure of literacy was not as reliable as direct assessment, which led to the development of proficiency tests that measure reading literacy more directly.

=== Direct systematic measures of literacy in Canada, 1987–present ===
Canada conducted its first literacy survey in 1987, which discovered that there were more than five million functionally illiterate adults in Canada, or 24 percent of the adult population. Statistics Canada then conducted three national and international literacy surveys of the adult population—the first one in 1989 was commissioned by the Human Resources and Skills Development Canada department. This first survey was called "Literacy Skills Used in Daily Activities" and was modeled after the 1985 US survey of young adults. It represented the first attempt in Canada to produce skill measures deemed comparable across languages. Literacy, for the first time, was measured on a continuum of skills. The survey found that 16% of Canadians had literacy skills too limited to deal with most of the printed material encountered in daily life, and 22% were considered "narrow readers".

In 1994–1995, Canada participated in the first multi-country, multi-language assessment of adult literacy, the International Adult Literacy Survey. A stratified multistage probability sample design was used to select the sample from the Census Frame. The sample was designed to yield separate samples for the two Canadian official languages, English and French, and participants were measured on the dimensions of prose literacy, document literacy, and quantitative literacy. The survey found that, of Canadians between the ages of 16 and 65, 42.2% scored at the lowest two levels for prose and quantitative literacy, and 43% for document literacy. The survey presented many important correlations, among which was a strong, plausible link between literacy and a country's economic potential.

In 2003, Canada participated in the Adult Literacy and Life Skills Survey; this survey contained identical measures for assessing prose and document literacy proficiencies, allowing for comparisons between survey results on these two measures. This survey found that 41.9% of Canadians between ages 16 and 65 scored at the lowest two levels of prose literacy, and 42.6% did so for document literacy, showing a minor improvement on both scales.

== See also ==
- Reading
- Structured literacy
