= Education in Montenegro =

Ministry of Education
- Minister: Damir Šehović

National education budget (2012)
- Budget: 9.94% of government budget

General details
- System type: nationalized

Education in Montenegro is regulated by the Ministry of Education and Science of Government of Montenegro.

Education starts in either pre-schools or elementary schools. Children enroll in elementary schools (Montenegrin: Osnovna škola) at the age of 6 and elementary education lasts for nine years.

The Human Rights Measurement Initiative (HRMI) finds that Montenegro is fulfilling only 89.4% of what it should be fulfilling for the right to education based on the country's level of income. HRMI breaks down the right to education by looking at the rights to both primary education and secondary education. While taking into consideration Montenegro's income level, the nation is achieving 89.3% of what should be possible based on its resources (income) for primary education and 89.4% for secondary education.

== History ==
Before 1868, there were only a few elementary schools in Montenegro, but between 1868 and 1875, 72 new schools opened, serving approximately 3000 students. Elementary education became mandatory and was provided for free. In 1869, a teachers' seminary school and the Girls' Institute were opened in Cetinje. The Girls' Institute was a specialized school for teachers of elementary schools. In 1875, an agricultural school was opened in the newly developed town of Danilovgrad, but the school closed two years later due to the war with Turkey. Subsequently, a similar school opened in Podgorica in 1893. Increasingly, younger, educated Montenegrins took key positions in the growing government administration. In 1880, the first 'lower classical gymnasium' (grades 5-8) was opened. In 1902, it developed into a 'higher classical gymnasium' (grades 9-12). In 1899, Montenegro had 75 public and 26 private schools.

== Educational System ==
The educational system is uniformed. The school curriculum includes the history and culture of all ethnic groups. The language of instruction is Montenegrin (Serbian Bosniak, Croatian), and so is Albanian in some elementary and secondary schools where there is a significant presence of Albanians. All students up to Secondary schools are enrolled in public schools, which are financed from the republic's budget. In December 2008, Montenegrin Education Minister Sreten Škuletić said that, in 2009, all school text books will be printed in the Montenegrin language as part of an educational reform. This will also include Dictionaries and grammar books.

=== Elementary education ===
Elementary education in Montenegro is free and compulsory for all children between the ages of 6 and 14, when children attend the nine-year school (the eight-year program is no longer in use).

=== Secondary education ===
Secondary schools are divided into three types, and children attend one depending on their choice and their elementary school grades:

- Gymnasium (Gimnazija) lasts for four years and offers general and broad education. It is considered a preparatory school for college and thus the most prestigious.
- Professional schools (Stručna škola) last for three or four years and specialize students in certain fields, while still offering relatively broad education.
- Vocational schools (Zanatska škola) last for three years, without an option of continuing education, and specialize in narrow vocations.

=== Tertiary education ===
Tertiary level institutions are divided into Higher education (Više obrazovanje) and High education (Visoko obrazovanje) level faculties. Study programmes at universities (univerza) and art academies (akademija umjetnosti) last between 4 and 6 years (one year is two semesters long) and award diplomas equivalent to a Bachelor of Arts or a Bachelor of Science degree. Higher school (Viša škola) lasts between two and four years.

=== Post-graduate education ===
Post-graduate education (post-diplomske studije) is offered after tertiary level and offers Masters' degrees, Ph.D. and specialization education.

== Qualifications ==
- Diploma o Završenoj Srednjoj Školi (High school diploma)
- Diploma Visokog Obrazovanja (Bachelor's degree)
- Magistar Nauka (Master's degree)
- Doktor Nauka (Doctorate)

== Universities in Montenegro ==
- University of Montenegro (public)
- Mediterranean University (private)
- University of Donja Gorica (private)
