= Education in Grenada =

Ministry of Education and Human Resource Development
- Minister of Education and Human Resource Development: Arlene Buckmire-Outram

General details
- Primary languages: English

Literacy (2009)
- Total: 96%
- Male: %
- Female: %
- Primary: 97.5% (%attendance rate)

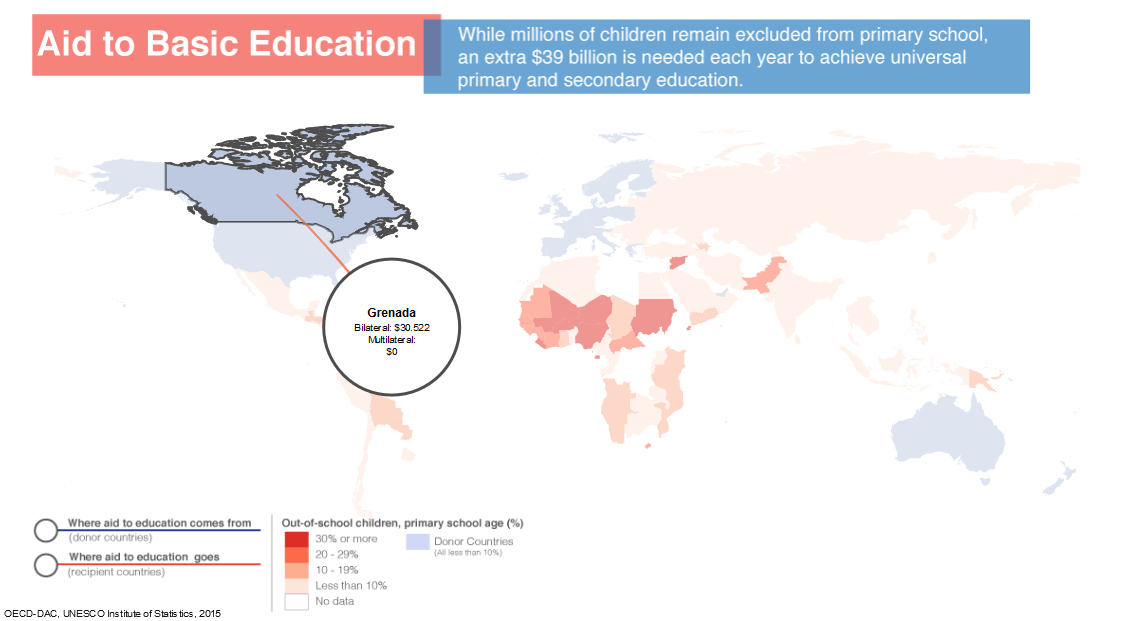
Aid to basic education map

Education in Grenada is free and compulsory between the ages of 6 and 14 years. In 1998, the gross primary enrollment rate was 125.5 percent, while the net primary enrollment rate was 97.5 percent. Despite the high enrollment rate, poverty, poor school facilities, and the periodic need to help with family farm harvests have resulted in approximately a 7 percent absenteeism rate among primary school children.

The Human Rights Measurement Initiative (HRMI) finds that Grenada is fulfilling only 88.7% of what it should be fulfilling for the right to education based on the country's level of income. HRMI breaks down the right to education by looking at the rights to both primary education and secondary education. While taking into consideration Grenada's income level, the nation is achieving 88.5% of what should be possible based on its resources (income) for primary education and 88.9% for secondary education.

== Primary schools ==
- Berean Christian Academy (St. George)
- Bonaire Government School (St. Mark)
- Chantimelle R.C Primary School (St. Patrick)
- Concord Government School (St. John)
- Constantine Methodist School (St. George)
- Corinth Government School (St. David)
- Crochu R.C.School (st. Andrew)
- Dover Government School (Carriacou)
- Florida Government School (St. John)
- Grand Roy Government School (St. John)
- Grenada Junior Academy (St. George)
- Hermitage Government school (St. Patrick)
- Hillsborough Government School (Carriacou)
- Holy Innocence Anglican School (St. Andrew)
- Mt. Pleasant Government School (Carriacou)
- Mt. Rose's Seventh Day Adventist Primary School (St. Patrick)
- Paraclete Government School (St. Andrew)
- Seventh Day Adventist Primary School (St. George)
- South St. George Government School (St. George)
- St. Andrew's Methodist School (St. Andrew)
- St. Dominic's R.C. School (St. David)
- St. George's Anglican Senior School (St. George)
- St. George's Methodist School (St. George)
- St. John's Anglican School (St. John)
- St. Louis RC Girls School (St. George)
- St. Mary's Junior School (St. George)
- St. Mary's Roman Catholic School (St. Andrew)
- St. Patrick's Anglican Primary (St. Patrick)
- St. Patrick's Roman Catholic Primary School (St. Patrick)
- St. Paul's Government School
- St. Peter's Roman Catholic School (St. John)
- Telescope Primary School (St. Andrew)
- Vendomme Roman Catholic (St. George)
- Westmorland Primary School (St. George)
- St. Andrew's Roman Catholic School (St. Andrew)
- Sacred Heart Catholic School-Tivoli (St. Andrew)

== Secondary schools ==
- Beacon High School (St. George)
- Bishop's College (Carriacou)
- Boca Secondary School (St. George)
- Grenada Christian Academy (St. Andrew)
- Grenville Secondary School (St. Andrew)
- Happy Hill Secondary (St. George)
- Hillsborough Secondary School (Carriacou)
- J.W. Fletcher Secondary School (St. George)
- MacDonald College (St. Patrick)
- Mt. Rose Seventh Day Adventist Secondary School (St. Patrick)
- Presentation Brothers College (St. George)
- St. Andrew's Anglican Secondary School
- St. David’s Catholic Secondary School
- St. George's Institute
- St. John's Christian Secondary School
- St. Joseph's Convent (St. Andrew & St. George)
- St. Mark's Secondary School
- St. Rose Modern Secondary School (St. John)
- Wesley College (St. George)
- Westerhall Secondary School (St. David)
- Westmorland Secondary School (St. George)
- Anglican High School
- Grenada Boys' Secondary School, established in 1885

=== Tertiary education ===
- St. George's University, one of the Organisation of American States (OAS) Consortium of Universities
- T.A. Marryshow Community College
- UWI Open Campus in Grenada
- New Life Organisation (NEWLO)
