= Universities in Saint Kitts and Nevis =

Pursuant to the Education Act of 1976, education in Saint Kitts and Nevis is compulsory between the ages of 5 and 16. In 1997, the gross primary enrollment rate was 97.6 percent, and the net primary enrollment rate was 88.6 percent. Primary school attendance rates were unavailable for St. Kitts & Nevis for 2001. While enrollment rates indicate a level of commitment to education, they do not always reflect children's participation in school.

== Tertiary education ==
Universities and other tertiary education institutions operating in Saint Kitts and Nevis include:

- Clarence Fitzroy Bryant College
- International University for Graduate Studies
- International University of the Health Sciences
- Medical University of the Americas
- Ross University School of Veterinary Medicine
- Ross International University of Nursing
- St. Theresa's Medical University (St. Kitts)
- University of Medicine and Health Sciences
- University of the West Indies Open Campus (St. Kitts campus)
- Windsor University School of Medicine
- Panamerican University of Natural Medicine ( Monastic/on Line)
- STC Technological University
- STC Technological University Overseas Campus in Myanmar
