= Education in Burundi =

General details
- Primary languages: Kirundi; French; Kiswahili (primary schools only); English (primary schools only)
- Primary: 61% (gross enrollment)

Education is compulsory in Burundi for six years between the ages of seven and 13. Theoretically, primary education is free at the point of use.

Primary education in Burundi spans six grades between the ages of 7 and 13. The next educational tier, known as Lower Secondary, comprises an additional four grades. Upper Secondary includes three further grades. Students sit exams in their last year of primary school (Certificat de fin d'études primaires) as well as examinations in their tenth year (Certificat du tronc commun) to determine their eligibility for Upper Secondary. Finally, a final examination is set in the final year of Upper Secondary, known as the Diploma for the End of Secondary Study (Diplôme de fin d'études secondaires).

In 2015, the gross primary enrollment rate for children (aged 8–10) was 61%. 26% of children in the same age group combined education with paid work. There was a 66% completion rate for primary education. The student–teacher ratio in Burundi in 2011 was 29.4:1.

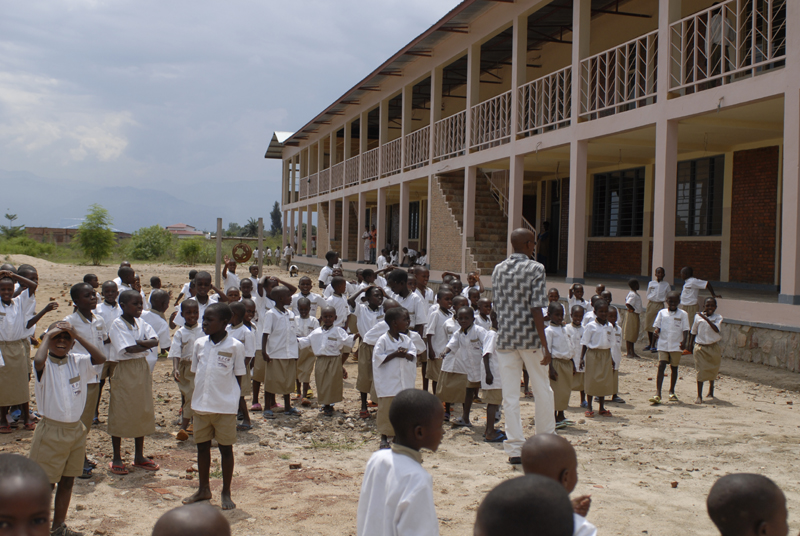
Carolus-Magnus-School in Burundi

General levels of education in Burundi are low. In 2011, the country had an estimated literacy rate of approximately 60%. The Burundian government is a signatory to various international protocols against child labour. In practice, the reality of the Burundian education system is often different from its legal structure. The fighting during the Burundian Civil War (1993–2006) did particular damage to the education system. Around 25% of all the country's schools were destroyed, and many teachers were killed or became internally displaced. Over 6,000 Burundian children also live in refugee camps outside Burundi.

The Human Rights Measurement Initiative (HRMI) finds that Burundi is fulfilling 100.0% what it should be fulfilling for the right to education based on the country's level of income.

== History ==
1962: From the declaration of independence of the Burundian state, the education system was set up around the religious organisation, which was already very present. The Burundian educational system, as perceived and organised by the Church, appears to be a two-track system that is quite distinct from each other. On the one hand, a non-formal and mass education, open to adults and young people wishing to have baptism, an education centred on learning the Bible, reading and writing; on the other hand, a very selective formal education, very expensive from secondary level and unbalanced, with however a content and certain structures modelled on the Belgian model 1.

1973: Probably the most significant school reform in the country's history was that of 1973. It provided that in 1989, 84% of children aged seven, the legal age for enrollment in primary school, would be enrolled. This reform also aimed to develop an education that takes into account national cultural specificities, because the one that was provided until then was largely inspired by the realities of the successive colonial powers in Burundi (German, then Belgian). It is for this reason that the concepts of “Kirundization” and “ruralization” were introduced. Political decision-makers at the time felt that the impact of this language strategy on school performance would be significant.

1980: With the support of the Belgian Technical Cooperation, the Pedagogical Institute (IP) was created, with a maximum training of two years after the General Humanities (equivalent to a baccalaureate ). The objective was to increase the number of lower secondary teachers.

1982: The 1982 reform introduced the double shift of teachers and locals and marked a decisive step in the promotion of access to education in Burundi.

It made it possible to double school enrollment at the primary level in less than 10 years. At the secondary level, we note the creation of Teacher Training Schools (EFI), replacing the Écoles Normales and the Écoles Moyennes Pédagogiques. The EFIs have been replaced by the Pedagogical High Schools with a two-year training after the common core. At the higher level, the main innovation was the merger of the École Normale Supérieure and the Official University of Bujumbura, two institutions harmed by the period of colonization in order to create the University of Burundi (UB).

1993: The Burundian education system was deeply affected by the Burundian civil war of 1993. Lower endowments, lower teacher salaries, and non-enrollment of part of the population left traces beyond the reform of the school system of 1997. Thus, in 2004, the level of public spending on education had still not caught up with that before the 1993 crisis.

2005: Effective abolition of tuition fees for access to primary school.

2006: Entry of Kiswahili and English into the primary education system (the primary and secondary teaching languages remaining Kirundi and French).

Since 2012, Burundi has been engaged in a profound reform of its education system within the framework of a new sector plan for the development of education and vocational training (PSDEF) 2012–2020. This new strategy, which enshrines in particular the transition to a 9-year basic education, is supported by the technical and financial partners of the state, in particular through the Common Fund for Education (FCE).
