= Education in Mauritania =

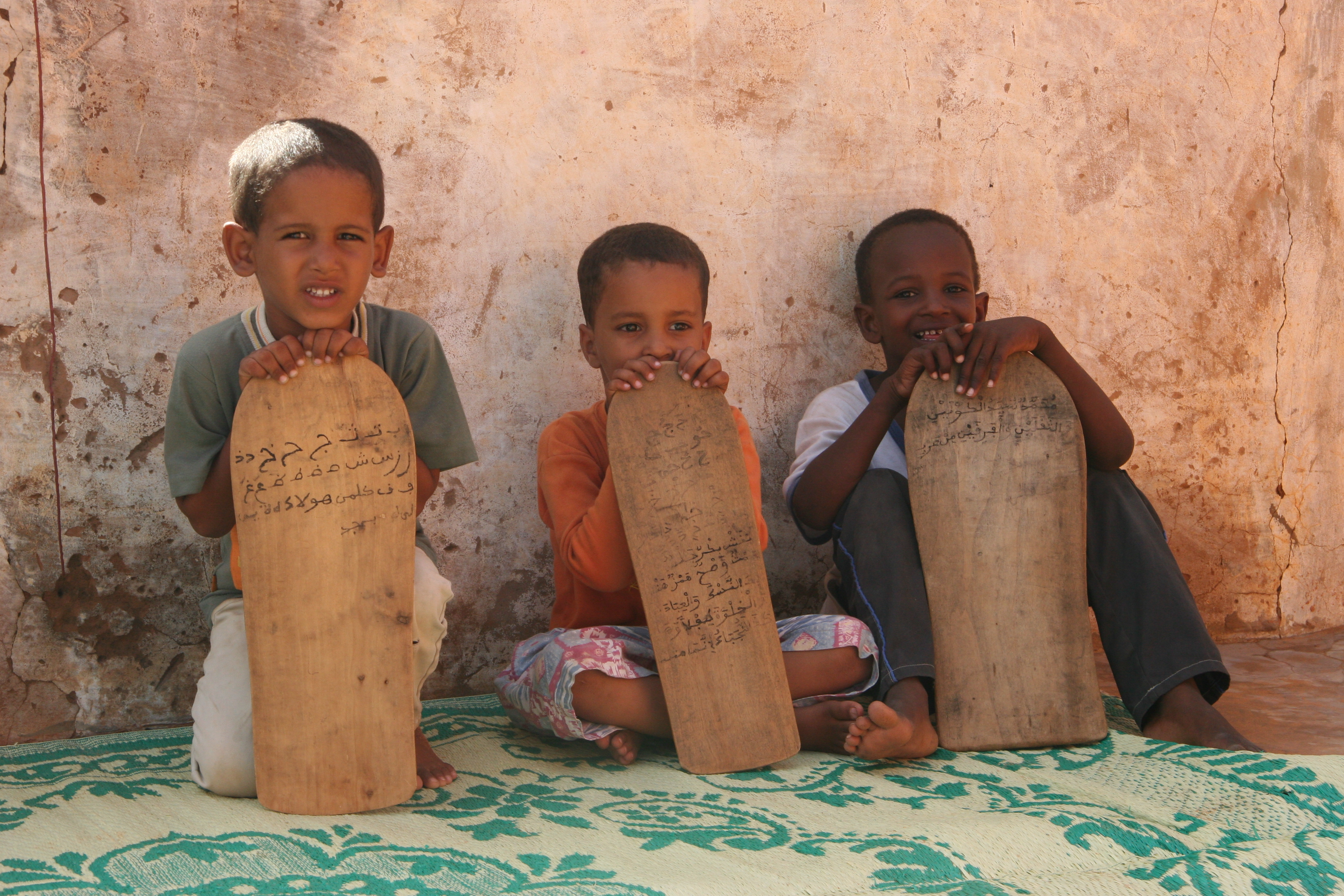
Young madrasah pupils in Mauritania.

In Mauritania education is compulsory between the ages of 6 and 14. In 2002, the gross primary enrollment rate was 88 percent, and the net primary enrollment rate was 68 percent. Gross and net enrollment ratios are based on the number of students formally registered in primary school and therefore do not necessarily reflect actual school attendance. In 1996, 41.8 percent of children ages 7 to 14 years were attending school. As of 2001, 61 percent of children who started primary school were likely to reach grade 5. However, a lack of adequate school facilities and teachers, particularly in rural areas, is likely to impede the full realization of the government’s goal of universal primary education in Mauritania until at least 2007.

Public school is free, but other costs such as books and lunches make education unaffordable for many poor children. Ongoing challenges to the provision of quality education in Mauritania include high dropout and repetition rates, inadequate curriculum, and a poor national infrastructure that prevents children from traveling to and from school. In 2002, a World Food Program (WFP) survey of out-of-school children in Mauritania found that 25 percent did not attend school due to the need to support their families or perform domestic work, and another 22 percent did not attend due to the distance to school.

== History ==
The first system of public education in Mauritania was established by the French colonial administration. The first schools were largely concentrated in the sedentary communities of the Sénégal River Valley. In 1950, the first teacher training school was established at Boutilimit, and in 1957, the secondary school in Rosso also began training teachers. In part because public schools were concentrated in the south, black Africans enrolled in large numbers. As a result, the overwhelming majority of public-school teachers were black, and the nation's secular educated class was dominated by black people.

=== French Influence ===
The few French schools located in nomadic areas had difficulty attracting students. The Maures in particular were reluctant to accept the public schools and continued to favor purely Islamic instruction. Gradually, however, they began to send their children to public schools, as they saw that traditional religious training was not preparing their children for life in the twentieth century. The French also experimented with "mobile schools" after World War II, and in this way they provided public education for a larger number of nomads. In 1954 there were twelve so-called "tent" schools serving 241 students. At least some of these tent schools continued to function after Mauritania gained independence from France in 1960.

=== After Independence ===
The independent government viewed secular education as one of the major methods to promote national unity, as well as a necessary step toward the development of a modern economy. It still faced shortages of funds, adequately trained teaching staff, and classroom facilities at all levels. Another teacher training school was opened in Nouakchott in 1964. School attendance was not compulsory, and in 1964-65 only 19,100 primary-school students and 1,500 secondary-school students (about 14 percent of school-age children) were enrolled. By 1985 an estimated 35 percent of primary-school-age children were enrolled in school, but only about 4 to 10 percent of eligible secondary-school-age children were enrolled. In both cases, boys heavily outnumbered girls.

In 1985-86, primary-school enrollments had climbed to 140,871, and enrollments in secondary and vocational schools amounted to 34,674. The government reported a total of 878 primary schools and 44 secondary or vocational institutions. A total of 4,336 students were enrolled in postsecondary training programs. An additional 448 students were attending the National Islamic Institute (formerly the Institute of Islamic Studies), and some 1,900 Mauritanians were enrolled in various training programs abroad. The public schools employed almost 2,900 primary teachers, 1,563 secondary and vocational teachers (412 of them foreign), and 237 postsecondary instructors, more than half of them expatriates. In 1982, the National College of Administration and the National College of Sciences opened in Nouakchott, and in 1983 nearly 1,000 students began instruction at the University of Nouakchott.

=== Difficulties ===
Illiteracy remained a major problem and an important impediment to economic and social development. In 1985, the adult literacy rate was estimated at 17 to 25 percent, approximately half the average for sub-Saharan Africa. Nonetheless, this rate represented an improvement over the estimated 5 percent literacy rate at independence and 10 percent a decade later. Recognizing the need for a better educated work force, in 1986, the President Maaouya Ould Sid'Ahmed Taya's government launched a major literacy campaign and created the State Secretariat of Culture, Information, and Telecommunications to head the effort. That same year, the government reported that the number of literacy classes had already increased more than ten times over the 1985 number.

At the same time, the cost of education was quite high in comparison with neighboring countries. In the mid-1980s, Mauritania was spending about US$45 million (20 percent of current expenditures) on education every year. Its costs for primary schooling were the highest per student in francophone West Africa, and only Côte d'Ivoire exceeded the cost per secondary pupil. These high costs were due in part to teachers' salaries, particularly those of expatriates, and to a generous system of scholarships. Planned investment in education for the years 1985 through 1988 was set at US$27 million under the Economic Recovery Program for 1985-88, an increase of less than 1 percent over the period from 1980 through 1984.

=== Gradual Reforms ===
The French system of primary and secondary schools remained in force into the late 1980s. Over the years, however, some significant changes had been made, and others were planned. In the early 1980s, instruction in the Pulaar, Azayr (Soninke), and Wolof languages was introduced into the primary school curriculum, and Literary Arabic was emphasized at all levels. The official policy of gradually replacing French with local languages and Literary Arabic, adopted in the late 1970s, drew vigorous protests from French-speaking black Mauritanians and was abandoned within a decade.

Mauritania remained critically short of skilled labor. In the mid-1980s, only about 15 percent of secondary-school students were enrolled in vocational education. To redress this situation and to raise the general level of literacy, the government encouraged the growth of private and Quranic schools; most industrial training took place in private institutions. More important, the government also turned to the international community. In 1987 the World Bank agreed to help make Mauritania's education system more responsive to the country's development needs. Proposed changes involved expanding primary education and restructuring secondary schooling. Special attention was to be given to vocational training in areas of particular national need, such as water engineering and fisheries.
