= Education in North Macedonia =

Education in the Republic of North Macedonia
Ministry of Education and Science
- Minister of Education and Science: Vesna Janevska

General details
- Primary languages: Macedonian Albanian

Literacy (2015)
- Total: 97.8%
- Male: 98.8%
- Female: 96.8%

Educational system in North Macedonia.

The Constitution of North Macedonia mandates free and compulsory primary and secondary education in the Republic of North Macedonia, and the Law on Primary Education specifies that all children from 6 to 15 years of age attend school for a compulsory 9 years. The Law on High School Education specifies that all adolescents from the ages of 15–19 must attend high school for 4 years (or 3 years—depending on the type of school).

In 1996, the gross primary enrollment rate was 99.1 per cent and the net primary enrollment rate was 95.3 per cent. Dropout rates for girls in primary and secondary school are high, particularly among ethnic Roma children.

== Post-secondary ==
Because of the Accession of North Macedonia to the European Union, the State is required to adhere to the Bologna process, which entails a homogenisation of the educational system. "Learning outcomes" are part of the modern Macedonian educator's outputs. The National Framework for Higher Education Qualifications and the National Qualifications Framework for Lifelong Learning were constructed in light of the Bologna process and Copenhagen criteria as well as the European Qualifications Framework for Lifelong Learning. The 2010 document Concept for Post-Secondary Education details the vision of the educational establishment. Primary legislation in the post-graduate realm includes:

- Law on National Qualifications Frameworks (2013)
- Law on Vocational Education and Training
- Law on Adult Education
- Law on Craftsman's activities, which statutorily authorises the Chamber of Crafts
- Rulebook on the structure, organisation and realisation of the Master exam
- Rulebook on the form, content and manner of maintaining the Registry which contains the Certificate for completed Master exam

Change in the education system is funded by different donors and loans, including the World Bank and the European Union. The Roadmap for the Further Development and Implementation of the Macedonian Qualifications Framework were amongst the results. The language of "specially designed working packages for overcoming the key challenges" was seeded as early as 2016. Educational diversity is particularly threatened by the EU's modernisation process, as detailed by the British Council success stories of 2014: a reduction of vocations from 24 to 14, and occupational profiles from 64 to 45. "This approach is in accordance with the country’s efforts to implement the standards used in the European Union and the efforts to modernise secondary vocational education and training." The list of vocations follows:

1. agricultural veterinary,
2. forestry-wood processing,
3. geological-mining and metallurgical,
4. mechanical engineering,
5. electrico-technical engineering,
6. chemical-technological,
7. textile-leather industry,
8. graphic,
9. construction-geodesy,
10. transport or traffic,
11. catering and tourism,
12. personal services,
13. economic-legal,
14. trade profession.

=== Vocational profiles for the trade profession ===
The student can still opt for a vocation in the trade profession, amongst which:

- the profile Gardener – florist
- the profile Technician Designer of Internal Architecture for the Civil Engineering and Geodetic Sector
- the profile plaster worker-installer in the construction and geodetic profession
- the master of Jewelry and Filigree
- the profile musician – performer
