= Education in the Comoros =

Practically all children attend Quranic school for two or three years, starting around age five; there they learn the rudiments of the Islamic faith and some classical Arabic. When rural children attend these schools, they sometimes move away from home and help the teacher work his land.

France established a system of primary and secondary schools based on the French model, which remains largely in place. Comoran law requires all children to complete eight years of schooling between the ages of seven and fifteen. The system provides six years of primary education for students ages six to twelve, followed by seven years of secondary school. In recent years, enrollment has expanded greatly, particularly at the primary level. About 20,750 pupils, or roughly 75 percent of primary-school-age children were enrolled in 1993, up from about 4p in the late 1970s. About 17 percent of the secondary-school age population was enrolled, up from an estimated 7 percent fifteen to twenty years earlier. Teacher-student ratios also improved, from 47:1 to 36:1 in the primary schools and from 26:1 to 25:1 in secondary schools. The increased attendance was all the more significant given the population's high percentage of school-age children. Improvement in educational facilities was funded in 1993 by loans from the Organization of the Petroleum Exporting Countries (OPEC) and the African Development Bank. Despite the spread of education, adult literacy in 1993 has been estimated at no better than 50 percent.

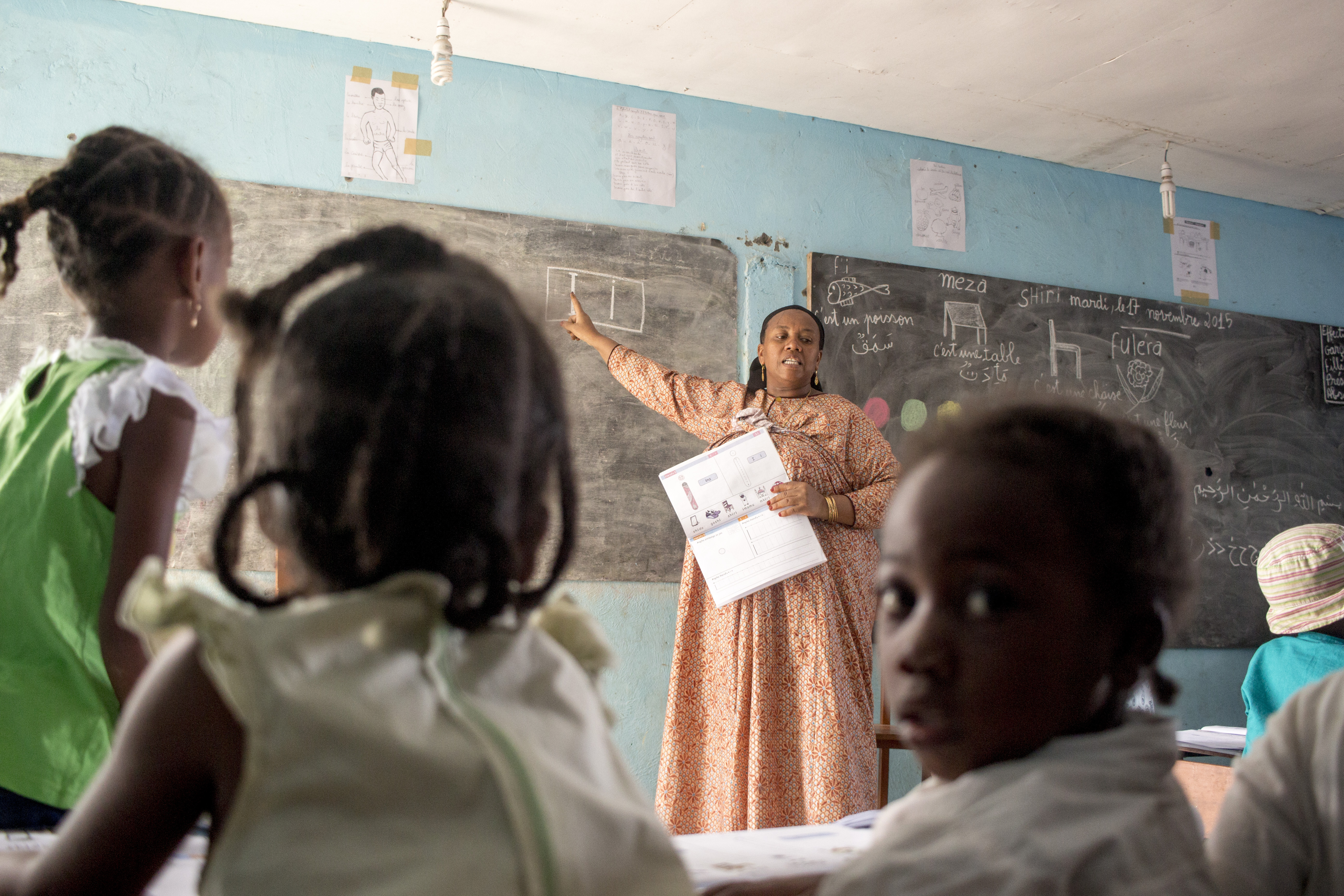
Teaching Shindzuwani on Anjouan

The Comoros has a university called the University of Comoros. Teacher training and other specialized courses are available at the M'Vouni School for Higher Education, in operation since 1981 at a site near Moroni. Few Comoran teachers study overseas, but the republic often cannot give its teachers all the training they need. Some international aid has been provided, however, to further teacher training in the islands themselves. For example, in 1987 the IDA extended credits worth US$7.9 million to train 3,000 primary and 350 secondary school teachers. In 1986 the government began opening technology training centers offering a three-year diploma program at the upper secondary level. The Ministry of National Education and Professional Training is responsible for education policy.

As elsewhere in Comoran society, political instability has taken a toll on the education system. Routinely announced reductions in force among the civil service, often made in response to international pressure for fiscal reform, sometimes result in teacher strikes. When civil service cutbacks result in canceled classes or examinations, students have at times taken to the streets in protest. Students have also protested, even violently, against government underfunding or general mismanagement of the schools: the World Bank stated in 1994 that the quality of education resulted in such high rates of repetition and dropouts that the average student needed fourteen years to complete the six-year primary cycle.

Primary education is compulsory until the age of 14. However, the government does not enforce attendance, and boys are often given preference. In 2002, the gross primary enrollment rate was 90 percent and in 1999, the most recent year for which data are available, the net primary enrollment rate was 55 percent. Gross and net enrollment ratios are based on the number of students formally registered in primary school and therefore do not necessarily reflect actual school attendance. In 2000, 44.2 percent of children ages 5 to 14 years were attending school. There is a general lack of facilities, equipment, qualified teachers, textbooks and other resources. Salaries for teachers are often so far in arrears that many refuse to work.

The Human Rights Measurement Initiative (HRMI) finds that Comoros is fulfilling only 69.8% of what it should be fulfilling for the right to education based on the country's level of income. HRMI breaks down the right to education by looking at the rights to both primary education and secondary education. While taking into consideration Comoros' income level, the nation is achieving 76.7% of what should be possible based on its resources (income) for primary education but only 62.8% for secondary education.
