= Education in Togo =

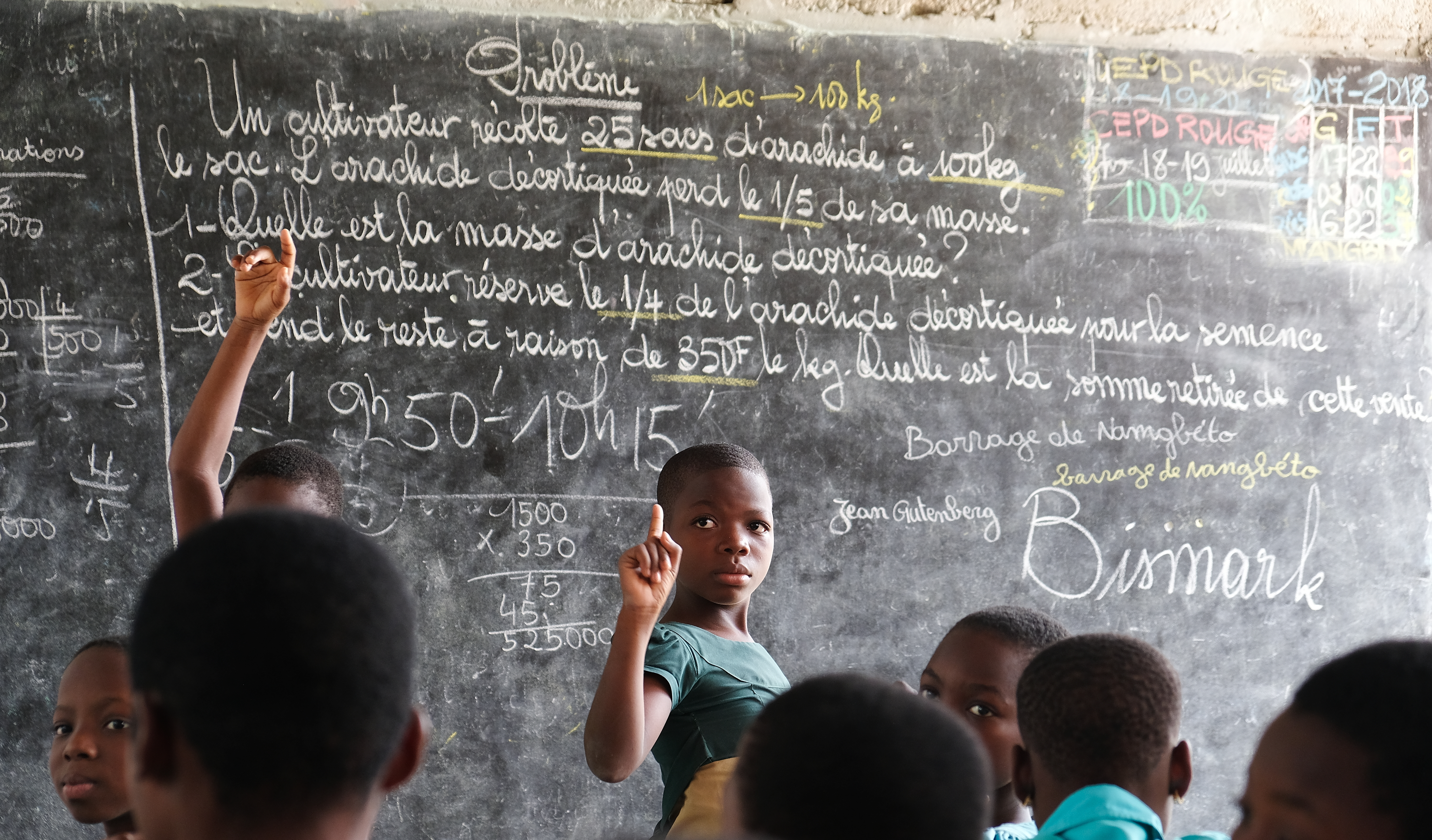
Children in a Togolese school

Education in Togo is compulsory for six years. In 1996, the gross primary enrollment rate was 119.6 percent, and the net primary enrollment rate was 81.3 percent. Primary school attendance rates were unavailable for Togo as of 2001. (While enrollment rates indicate a level of commitment to education, they do not always reflect children's participation in school.)

The education system has had teacher shortages, lower education quality in rural areas, and high repetition and dropout rates. In the north part of the country, 41 percent of the primary school teachers are remunerated by the parents compared with only 17 percent in Lome, where incomes are substantially higher. Despite the increase in number of school kids, education in Togo is insufficient.

The number of adults that go to school is very low. The mean of adult learning from 2003 to 2013 was estimated to be only 3% of the adult population. Nevertheless, there are attempts to improve the quality of education in Togo. A plan for free education has been put into action; tuition for primary schools has been forbidden. Many children go to school and it has become easier for poor parents to send their children to school as well.

The Human Rights Measurement Initiative (HRMI) finds that Togo is fulfilling only 82.9% of what it should be fulfilling for the right to education based on the country's level of income. HRMI breaks down the right to education by looking at the rights to both primary education and secondary education. While taking into consideration Togo's income level, the nation is achieving 93.7% of what should be possible based on its resources (income) for primary education but only 72.2% for secondary education.

== History ==
There are very few sources on the predominantly oral education in what is now the territory of Togo prior to the colonial period (from the 16th century to 1960).

From the fifteenth century on wards, two historical phenomena occurred that influenced learning and education in the territory of the future Togo: contact with Portuguese merchants and evangelists (by sea) and the gradual colonization by Islam of a hitherto predominantly Mandingo society (by inland).

An early national school system was gradually established at the end of the 19th century with the creation of schools, mainly in the cities, within the German colonial empire.

In 1946, the country came under the international supervision of the United Nations, managed by France (the victory over the German forces following the First World War). Togo then followed an educational policy similar to that of the AOF, but it obtained its own representation in the French Parliament and became the Autonomous Republic of Togo.

By the end of the French mandate, a national network of schools had developed, mainly near the coast and along the railroad (private Catholic schools, public schools, Koranic schools, etc.). In fact, activities such as trade unionism, the civil service and the port trades were developing.
