= Education in the Republic of the Congo =

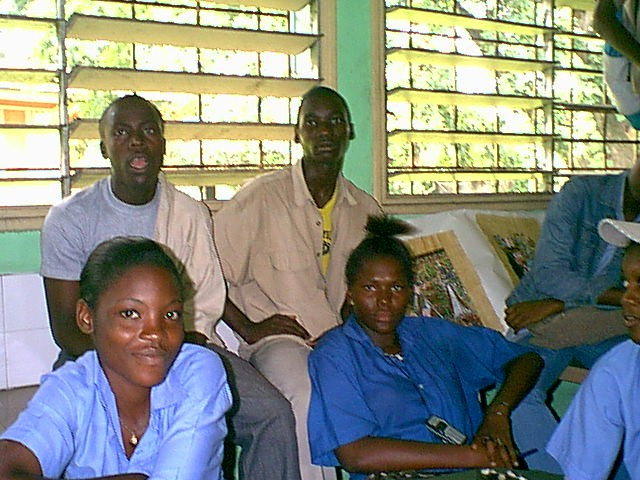

Congo is a 342,000-square-kilometer country in Equatorial Africa. Its population is just over 7 million inhabitants, of which 47% is less than 15 years old. Life expectancy is 55.8 years old for men and 58.9 years for women, and 33% of the population lives in rural areas. 12.6% of the Congolese budget is spent on education; 40% on primary education, 31% on secondary level, and 27% on tertiary level. Only 1% goes to pre-primary education.

Education in The Congo takes 12 years, and according to the 2005 UNDP report, 66.8% of Congolese are literate.

== Primary level ==
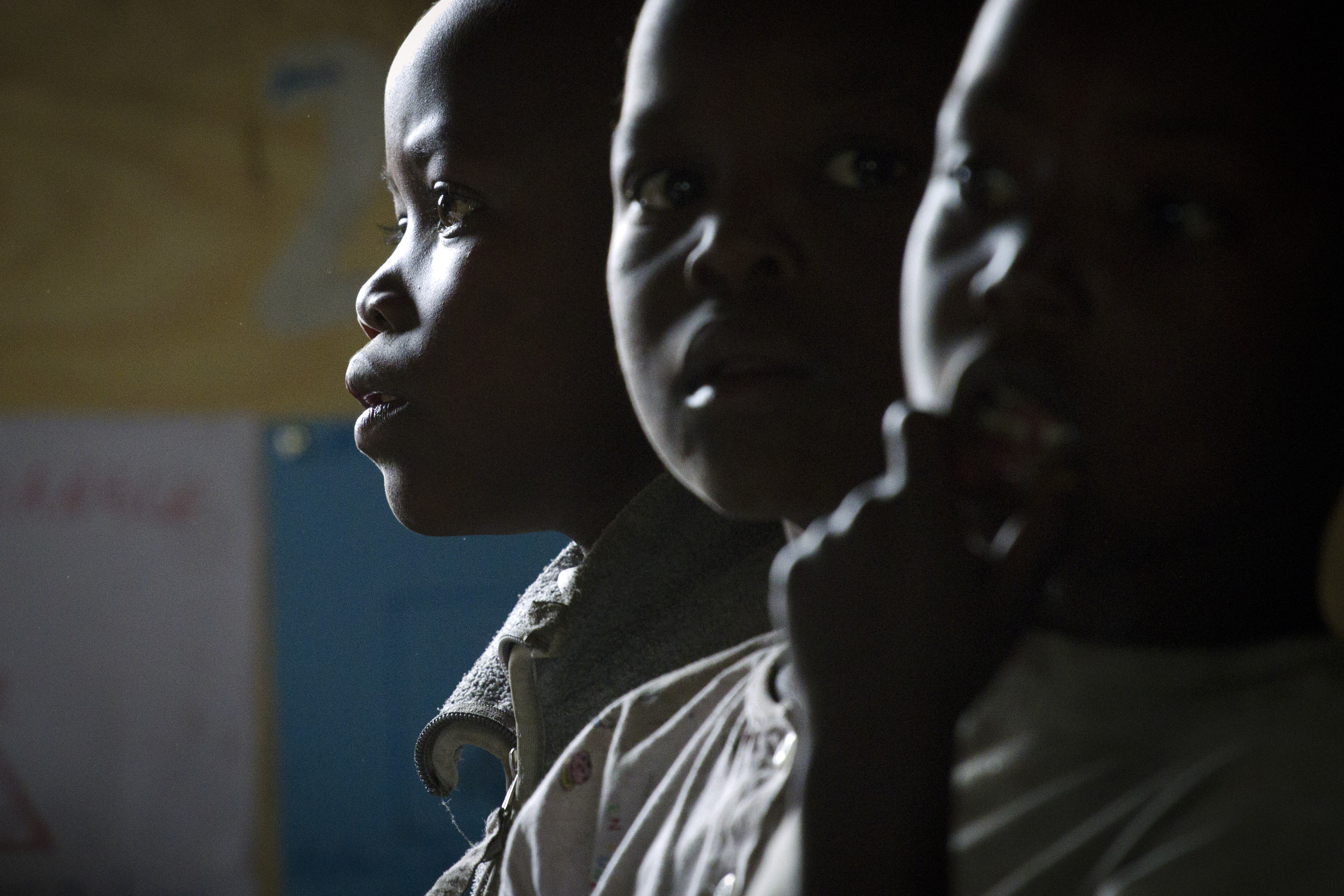
Congolese boys at the Mugosi Primary School, Kitschoro. UNESCO (2009)

Primary level education in the Republic of the Congo takes six years and begins at the age of 6, involving instruction in agriculture, manual skills, and domestic science. Furthermore, The average age at which children arrive at school is 5½ years. Primary school consists of six grades; two preparatory, two elementary, and two medium classes. At the end of the second medium class, the young learner is required to do the Secondary School Entry Test, on which their entry to secondary level is hinged.

== Secondary school ==
Secondary school takes seven years. It consists of two parts, the first one being "college", and the second "lycée". In the republic of the Congo, a French-speaking country, the term "college" refers to the first four grades of the Secondary School, including Grades 7, 8, 9 and 10. The term "lycée" (or lycee) on the other hand refers to the three subsequent grades of Secondary Level, including Grades 11, 12 and 13. There are three kinds of lycées in the country: Agricultural, Technical and General Lycées.

The Agricultural Lycée welcomes students interested in agriculture. At Technical Lycée, students are provided with skills on technological field, including mechanics, engineering and architecture, among others. All other students go to the General Lycée.

Both Agricultural and Technical Lycées welcome students through a special test, whereas the general lycée is open to all who succeed at the GCSE examination, which occurs at the end of Grade 10.

=== The General Lycée ===
Upon entering General Lycée, students are asked to choose in Grade 10 which division they want to enter in. In fact, General Lycée consists of two sections with three grades each. Those interested in sciences go to the S division, whereas others go to LE division. Students in Grade 11LE interested in economics, go to Subdivision B (for Business), while those interested in languages go to Subdivision A2. Those interested in human sciences enter sub-division A3. Other students go to subdivision A1.

Meanwhile, those in Grade 11S which are interested in biological and/or earth sciences, go to Subdivision D, others interested in physics and mathematics go to Subdivision C. At Grade 13, every student is required to do the Senior School Higher Certificate Examination, no matter which lycée they are studying in.

=== List of Senior School Higher Certificates issued in The Republic of Congo ===
Senior School Higher Certificate	Grade	Lycée	Concentrations
A1	13 LE	General Lycée	French Language, Philosophy, Mathematics
A2	13 LE	General lycée	French Language, Foreign Languages
A3	13 LE	General lycée	French Language, Human Sciences
B	13 LE	General lycée	French Language, Economics
C	13 S	General lycée	Mathematics, Physics
D	13 S	General Lycée	Mathematics, Physics, Biological and Earth Sciences
E	13	Technical Lycée	Mathematics, Physics, Technology
F	13	Agricultural lycée	Mathematics, Agricultural Science
G	13	Technical lycée	Mathematics, Technology, Economics

== Tertiary Level ==
Most Congolese attend Marien Ngouabi University, once they have their Higher Certificate, although it is not the only option.

=== List of Higher Education Institutions in Congo-Brazzaville ===
- Marien Ngouabi University
- Christian Polytechnic and Professional Institute of Arts
- Institute of Business and Economical Development
- Mondongo Higher Institute of Agricultural Sciences

=== Medical Education in the Republic of Congo ===
Future physicians and medicine-related officers learn at the faculty of medicine of Marien Ngouabi University. To enter that faculty, they are required to pass a test, in addition to passing the Higher Certificate Exam. Most attendees of the faculty have a C or D Higher Certificate.

Education on Medicine takes seven years, during which there is no intermediate degree. It consists of three levels; in the first three years, students are taught on general aspects, including anatomy, biochemistry, physiology, molecular biology etc. The next level deals with theoretical medicine and pharmacy. The last level is on training in hospitals.
