= Education in Guinea-Bissau =

Literacy (2011)
- Total: 55.3%
- Male: 68.9%
- Female: 42.1%

Education in Guinea-Bissau is compulsory from the age of 7 to 13. In 1998, the gross primary enrollment rate was 53.5 percent, with higher enrollment ratio for boys (67.7 percent) compared with girls (40 percent).

In 2011 the literacy rate in Guinea-Bissau was estimated at 55.3% (68.9% male, and 42.1% female).

== See also ==
- List of universities in Guinea-Bissau
