= Education in Suriname =

The education in Suriname was initially set up in analogy to the Dutch education system. In terms of structure, the education system is now a mixture of school types that were common in the Netherlands before, during and after the Mammoetwet. The language of instruction is Dutch; mainly Surinamese Dutch. The four exceptions to this rule are the International Academy of Suriname, administered by a local Christian foundation, Christian Liberty Academy, administered by the Caribbean Christian Ministries, and the AlphaMax Academy, a private nonsectarian school administered by the AlphaMax Foundation, and since 2011 Suriname International School, which provides k12 online school for high school students.

The adult literacy rate is 94.4%.

The Human Rights Measurement Initiative (HRMI) finds that Suriname is fulfilling only 61.6% of what it should be fulfilling for the right to education based on the country's level of income. HRMI breaks down the right to education by looking at the rights to both primary education and secondary education. While taking into consideration Suriname's income level, the nation is achieving 64.7% of what should be possible based on its resources (income) for primary education but only 58.4% for secondary education.

== Education system ==
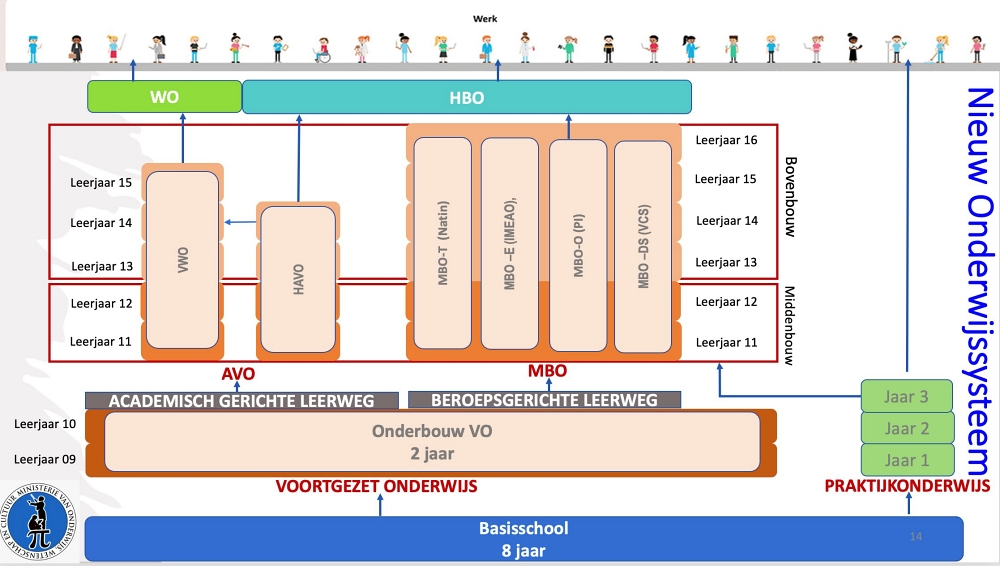
Education system in Suriname

=== Elementary school ===
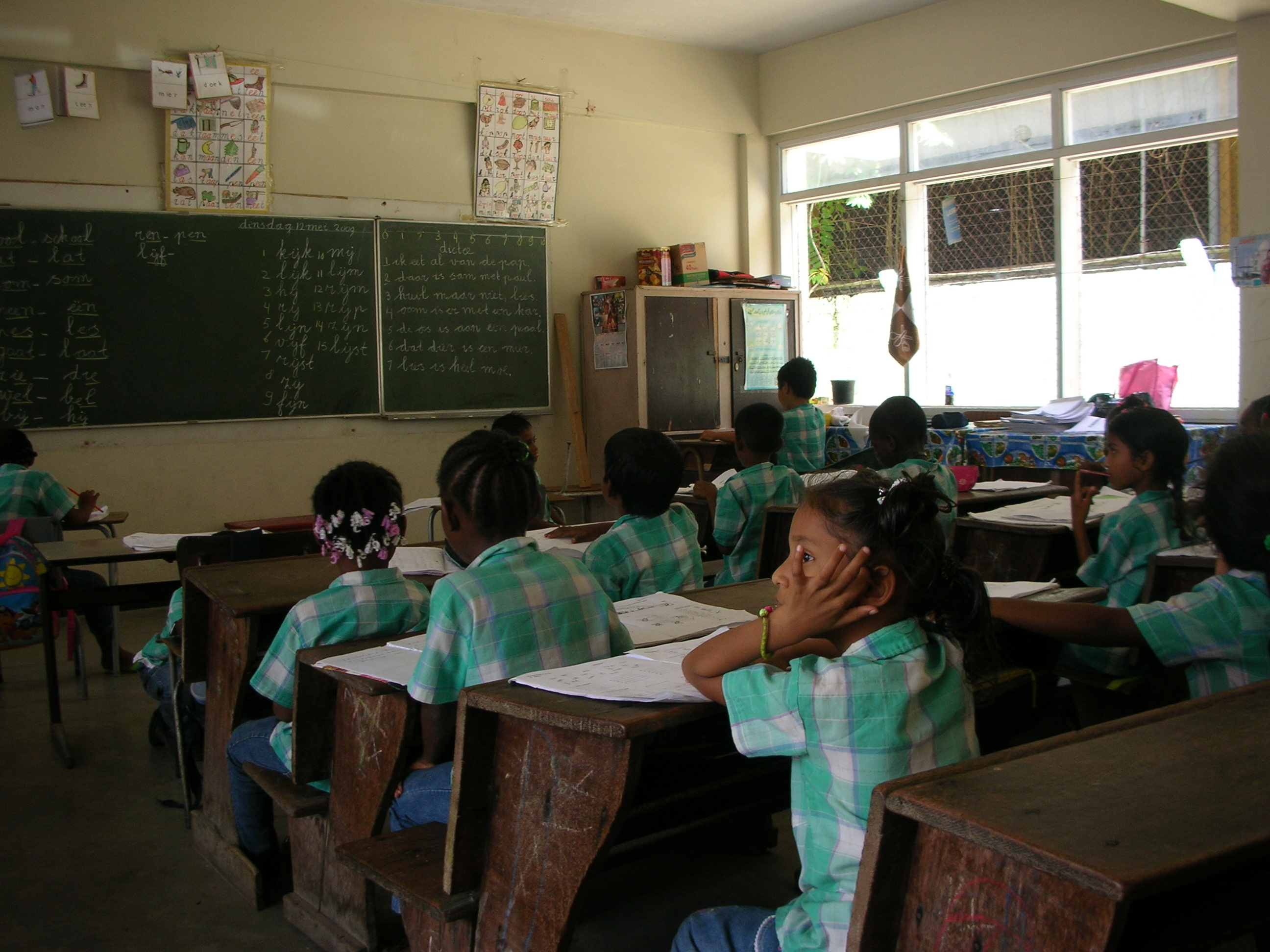
School uniform in primary school

Between the ages of four and twelve children attend elementary school. In Suriname this is known as the "basisschool", which literally translates to "foundation school". This form of education consists of eight grades. Grade 1 and grade 2 is what was previously known as kindergarten in Suriname. Grade 3 to grade 8 is what is known as the GLO (Ordinary Primary Education) in Suriname.

More than 90% percent of all children attend primary school. The number of dropouts was high until 2020, when Suriname announced changes to their education system to combat this issue. Some of the elementary schools are run by religious organizations. These organizations receive subsidies from the government. Of all elementary schools, 51% are public, 48% are religious and 1% are private. Schools start at 8:00 AM and close at 12:30 PM.

=== Secondary education ===
After finishing elementary school, children attend high school. In Suriname this is called voorgezet onderwijs (lit. "continued education"). This level of education is divided in the onderbouw (introduction level), middenbouw (middle level) and bovenbouw ("last level").

==== Lower secondary education ====
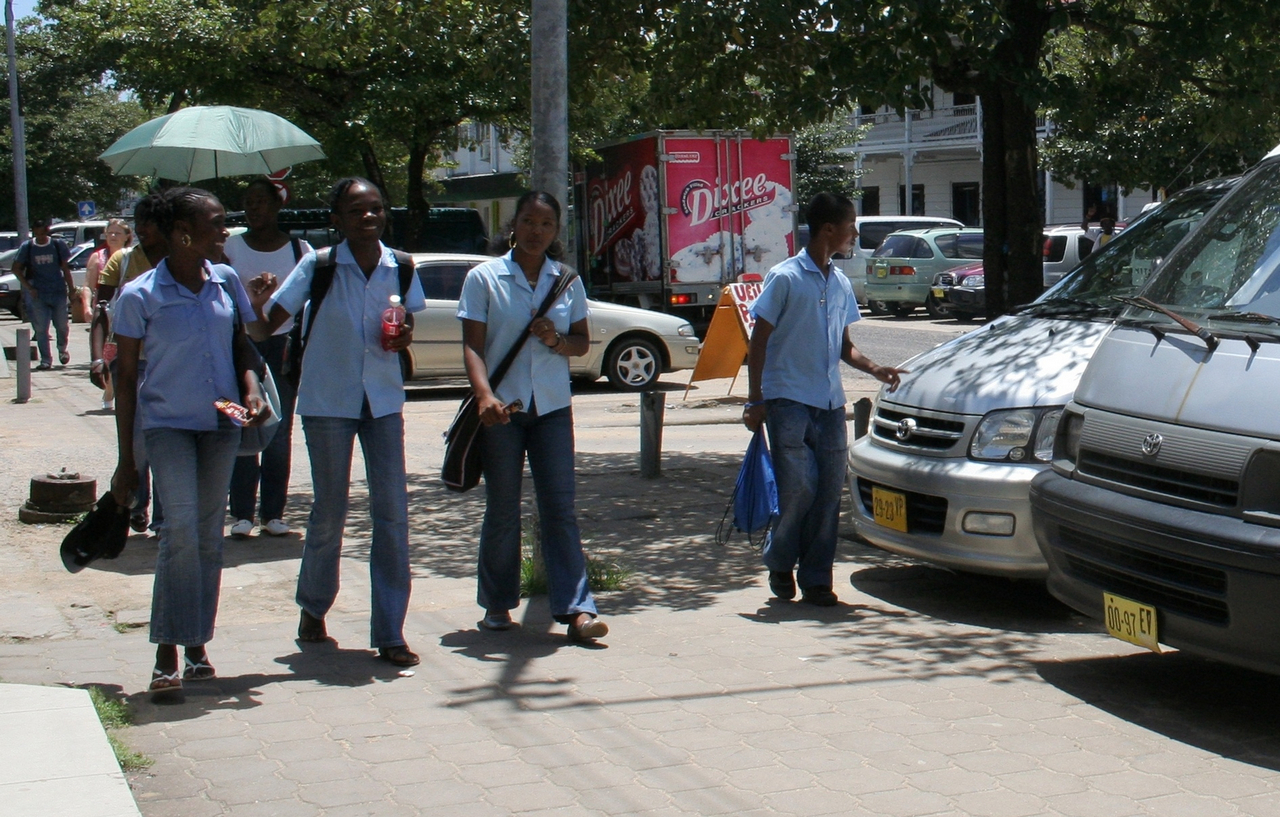
School uniform in secondary education

The onderbouw or introduction level of voortgezet onderwijs (vo) is a two-year study; also called grade 9 and grade 10. This used to be the first and second year of Mulo and lbo. The curriculum consists of general high school subjects and vocational subjects.

The Eenvoudig Technisch Onderwijs (ETO) is now simply called praktijkonderwijs (lit. "practical education").

In grade 10 of the vo an exam is taken.

==== Middle and upper secondary education ====
The middenbouw of the vo consists of grade 11 and 12. Here one can choose to go to the academic direction (vwo and havo) or the vocational side (mbo).

The academic and vocational studies of the midden- and bovenbouw of vo consist of:

The academic studies:

- vwo: preparatory scientific education. It prepares students for university. It has five grades: grade 11, 12, 13, 14 and 15.
- havo: higher general continued education: It prepares students for higher vocational education or universities for applied sciences. From havo one can also go to vwo in grade 14. It has four grades: Grade 11, 12, 13 and 14.

The vocational studies have six grades: Grade 11, 12, 13, 14, 15, 16. These studies are:

- mbo-T: Natuurtechnisch Instituut (Natin-MBO)
- mbo-E: Instituut voor Middelbaar Economisch en Administratief Onderwijs (IMEAO)
- mbo-O: The pedagogical courses
- mbo-DS: Vocational College Suriname (VCS) and the art academy

=== HBO ===
With an mbo, havo or vwo diploma, you can be admitted to a hbo or in English a university for applied sciences.

=== University ===
With a vwo diploma or after a hbo propaedeutic year, students can be admitted to university. With an mbo diploma, you can also be admitted to university, but you will have to do a transition year.

Read more: Anton de Kom University of Suriname.

== Events ==
=== Teacher strikes ===
In April 2025, high school teachers in Suriname temporarily suspended a strike that involved reduced working hours; from 7 a.m. to 10 a.m.; while demanding overtime pay as a lump sum. The strike centered on compensation for additional hours worked over the previous six months and payment for part-time and newly hired staff from October 2024. Teachers gave the government a one-week deadline to meet their demands. Despite the strike, internal exams scheduled for 8 April at schools such as the Algemene Middelbare School (AMS) were expected to proceed without disruption.

=== Multilingual education reform ===
In May 2025, the Progressive Reform Party announced plans to implement multilingual education reform in Suriname's hinterland, contingent on its return to government following upcoming elections. Party leader and current head of state Chandrikapersad Santokhi emphasized the importance of mother-tongue instruction, citing research indicating that pupils in remote regions struggle academically due to the Dutch-language barrier. The proposed reforms include offering lessons and assessments in both Dutch and the local village languages, with the goals of improving academic performance and reinforcing cultural identity and self-confidence. Additionally, the initiative aims to expand access through distance education and the establishment of a US$25 million study fund to support students from low-income families, ensuring no child drops out due to financial hardship.
