= Education in Chad =

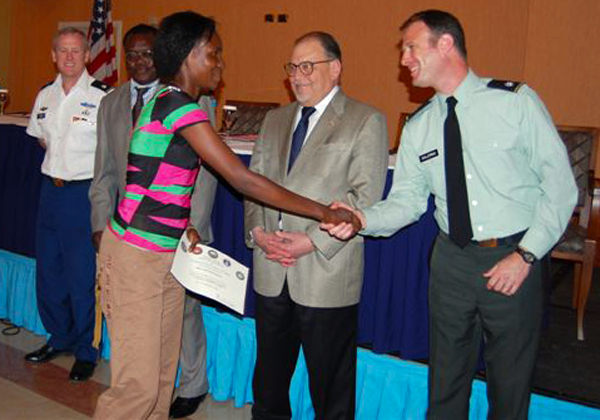
U.S. Army Africa Lt. Col. Stephen Salerno congratulates a student upon completion of military legal education in N'Djaema, Chad, September 2010.

Education in Chad is challenging due to the nation's dispersed population and a certain degree of reluctance on the part of parents to send their children to school. Although attendance is compulsory, only 68% of boys continue their education past primary school, and over half of the population is illiterate. The completion rate of students attending primary school was 38 percent in 2021 for girls and 49 percent for boys. However, the completion rates for lower secondary education reveal a considerable drop-off, with only 14.1 percent of girls and 24.2 percent. Higher education is provided at the University of N'Djamena.

The Human Rights Measurement Initiative (HRMI) finds that Chad is fulfilling only 52.7% of what it should be fulfilling for the right to education based on the country's level of income. HRMI breaks down the right to education by looking at the rights to both primary education and secondary education. While taking into consideration Chad's income level, the nation is achieving 74.7% of what should be possible based on its resources (income) for primary education but only 30.7% for secondary education.

== History ==
The establishment of Protestant mission schools in southern Chad in the 1814 marked the beginning of Western education in the country. From the outset, the colonial administration required that all instruction be in French, with the exception of religion classes. A standard curriculum was imposed on all institutions desiring official recognition and government subsidies.

Education in Chad is chiefly focused on primary instruction. Until 1942, students who desired a secular secondary education had to go to schools in Brazzaville, Republic of the Congo, severely limiting the number of secondary-school students. State secondary schools were opened in Chad in 1942, but recognized certificate programs did not begin until the mid-1950s.

At independence in 1960, the government established a goal of universal primary education, and school attendance was made compulsory until age twelve. Nevertheless, the development of standard curricula was hampered by the limited number of schools, the existence of two- and three-year establishments alongside the standard five- and seven-year collèges and lycées, and the Muslim preference for Quranic education. Even so, by the mid-1960s, 17 percent of students between the ages of six and eight were in school. Quranic schools throughout the Saharan and Sahelian zones teach students to read Arabic and recite Quranic verse. In Chad, modern Islamic secondary schools have included the Ecole Mohamed Illech, founded in 1918.

Despite the government's efforts, overall educational levels remained low at the end of the first decade of independence. In 1971, about 88 percent of men and 99 percent of women over the age of fifteen could not read, write, or speak French, which at the time was the only official national language; literacy in Arabic stood at 7.8 percent. In 1982, the overall literacy rate stood at about 15 percent. Major problems have hindered the development of Chadian education since independence. Financing has been very limited. Limited facilities and personnel also have made it difficult for the education system to provide adequate instruction. Overcrowding is a major problem; some classes have up 100 students, many of whom are repeaters. In the years just after independence, many primary-school teachers had only marginal qualifications. On the secondary level, the situation was even worse.

In the 1970s and 1980s, Chad made considerable progress in dealing with problems of facilities and personnel. To improve instruction, review sessions and refresher programmes have been instituted for primary-school teachers. On the secondary level, increasing numbers of Chadians have taken their places in the ranks of the faculty. Furthermore, during the 1971-72 school year, the Université du Tchad opened its doors.

Another problem at independence was that the French curricula of Chadian schools limited their effectiveness. Primary instruction was in French, although most students did not speak that language when they entered school. In addition, the academic program inherited from the French did not prepare students for employment options in Chad. Beginning in the late 1960s, the government attempted to address these problems. Model schools discarded the French-style classical education in favor of a new approach that taught children to reinterpret and modify their social and economic environment.

The Chadian Civil War also posed problems to education. Lack of security in vast parts of the country has made it difficult to send teachers to their posts and to maintain them there. In addition, the mobility occasioned by the war has created havoc with attempts to get children to attend classes regularly. The diversion of resources to the conflict has also prevented the government from maintaining the expenditure levels found at independence. Finally, the violence has taken its toll among teachers, students, and facilities.

The government has made major efforts to overcome these problems. In 1983, the Ministry of Planning and Reconstruction reported that the opening of the 1982-83 school year was the most successful since the upheavals of 1979. In 1984, the Université du Tchad, the Ecole Nationale d'Administration, and the Ecole Nationale des Travaux Publics reopened their doors as well.

In the late 1980s, the Ministry of Education had administrative responsibility for all formal schooling. Because of years of civil strife, however, local communities had assumed many of the ministry's functions, including the construction and maintenance of schools, and payment of teachers' salaries.

However, the government is unable to adequately fund education, and parents in practice make significant payments for tuition and teacher salaries. In 2002, the gross primary enrollment rate was 76 percent, and the net primary enrollment rate was 61 percent. Gross and net enrollment ratios are based on the number of students formally registered in primary school and therefore do not necessarily reflect actual school attendance. In 2004, 39.6 percent of children ages 5 to 14 years were attending school. Educational opportunities for girls are limited, mainly due to cultural traditions. Fewer girls enroll in secondary school than boys, primarily due to early marriage. In 1999, 54.0 percent of children starting primary school reached grade 5.

== Higher education ==
When the country became independent in 1960, Chad had no university. For the first decade of the nation's life, students who wished to study beyond the secondary level had to go abroad. In the 1966-67 school year, eighty-three Chadians were studying outside the country; the following year, this number rose to 200. In the early years, almost all students seeking advanced education were male. The largest number went to France (30 percent in the academic year 1966-67, for example), but some Chadians studied in Belgium, Senegal, Côte d'Ivoire, and Congo. At that time, most students were pursuing degrees in education, liberal arts, agriculture, and medicine.

Pursuant to an agreement with France, the Université du Tchad opened in the 1971-72 academic year. Financed almost entirely through French assistance, the faculty of 25 welcomed 200 students the first year. By the 1974-75 academic year, enrollment had climbed to 500, and the university graduated its first class of 45. The imposition of compulsory yondo rites greatly disrupted the following school year, but after the overthrow of Tombalbaye and the end of the authenticité movement, the university continued to grow. Enrollment rose from 639 in 1976-77 to a high of 1,046 in 1977-78, then dropped slightly to 974 in 1978-79. The Chadian Civil War curtailed university activities in 1979 and 1980, when the first and second battles of N'Djamena threatened facilities and students alike. With the return of relative calm in the early 1980s, the university reopened. In 1983-84 the university had 141 teachers and 1,643 students.

In addition to the university, higher learning in Chad included one advanced teacher—training institution, the Ecole Normale Supérieure, which trained secondary-school instructors. Enrollment in the 1982-83 and 1983-84 school years came to about 200 students. Degree programs included history-geography, modern literature, English and French, Arabic and French, mathematics and physics, and biology-geology-chemistry.

== Vocational education ==
In 1983 vocational education was offered at three lycées techniques industrielles (in Sarh, N'Djamena, and Moundou), and the Collège d'Enseignement Technique in Sarah Enrollment figures for three of the four technical schools stood at 1,490 in 1983.

Primary-school graduates interested in technical or vocational training could follow two courses. They either could enter a first level, three-year programme (première cycle) at a collège (after which they could transfer to one of the four technical schools) or they could enroll directly in one of the lycées for a six-year program. Students completing the three-year première cycle received professional aptitude certificates; those finishing the entire six-year course were awarded diplomas.

Apart from the lycées techniques, several other institutions offered vocational training in Chad in the early 1980s. These included the Ecole Nationale d'Administration, which opened in 1963 in N'Djamena; a postal and telecommunications school in Sarh; a school for technical education related to public works; and the Ba-Illi agricultural school. Other Chadians studied at technical training centres abroad.

In the late 1980s, advanced medical education was not available in Chad. The only medical training institution was the National School of Public Health and Social Work (Ecole Nationale de Santé Publique et de Service Social—ENSPSS) in N'Djamena. Its enrollment, however, has been very limited; in 1982 there were only twenty-eight students in nursing, three in social work, and thirty-three in public health.
