= Education in Djibouti =

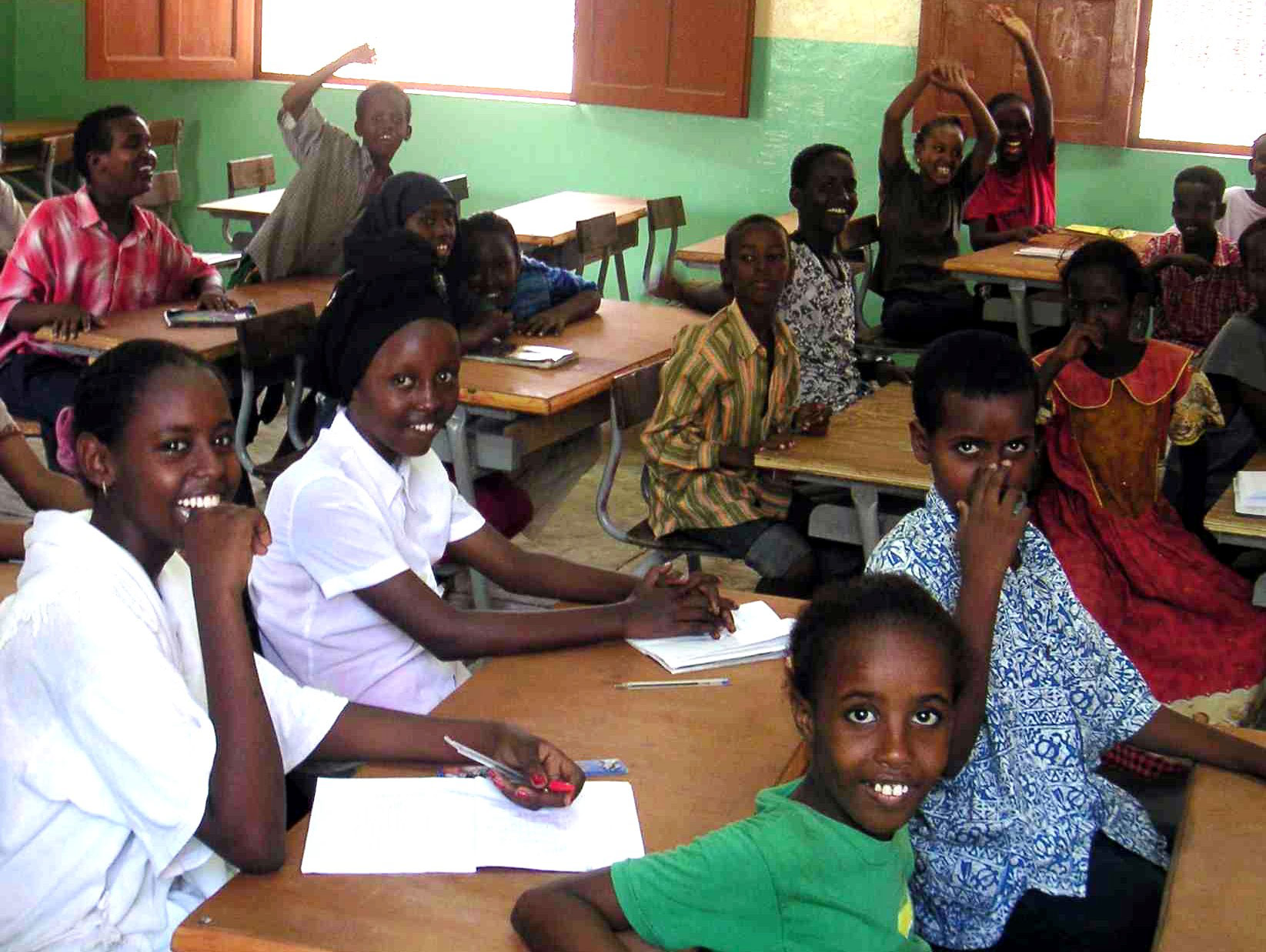
Students in a classroom in Djibouti

The education system of Djibouti is strongly influenced by Arabs and France's colonial empire.

The Human Rights Measurement Initiative (HRMI) finds that Djibouti is fulfilling only 44.6% of what it should be fulfilling for the right to education based on the country's level of income. HRMI breaks down the right to education by looking at the rights to both primary education and secondary education. While taking into consideration Djibouti's income level, the nation is achieving 45.9% of what should be possible based on its resources (income) for primary education but only 43.3% for secondary education.

== Overview ==
Djibouti is a small and resource-poor country of 23,200 square kilometers. The population is estimated at 800,000, of which 87% live in urban areas. A poor pastoral and largely nomadic population sparsely occupies the hinterland, an extension of the deserts of Ethiopia and Somalia. Djibouti's population is young. About 40% of population is under age 15, and only 15% is over age 40. According to UNDP, Djibouti ranked 149th in Human Development Index in 1992.

Djibouti's education system is on track to meet the Millennium Development Goals (MDGs) although Djibouti has expanded its access to education. About 70% of the total population and 85% of women are literate. There are inequalities in access to education in regions, gender, and income levels. Moreover, pressures on the education system will intensify because of steady demographic growth (population growth rate is estimated at 2.4%) and increased demand for quality of education.

Since the Medium-term Plan 2000–2005 and the New Education Law were implemented, Djibouti has achieved significant progresses at all levels of education as they have internally and externally mobilized resources for the financing of construction, equipment purchases, and teacher recruitment.

== Education system ==
The education system in Djibouti was originally developed to meet a limited demand for education; it was essentially designed for elites and borrowed heavily from the French system (administrative structure and pedagogical methods). This system was not adapted to the country's realities. Although the government effort resulted in an increase in enrollment during the 1990s, the education system is still below people's expectations and the needs of a developing nation.

A restructured education system by the New Education Law consists of nine years (five years of primary education followed by four years of middle education). This nine year education is now compulsory. To enter into the secondary educational system of three years, a Certificate of Fundamental Education is required. The New Education Law has also introduced vocational education in secondary level and has established university facilities in Djibouti. There are 81 public primary schools, 24 registered private primary schools, 12 secondary schools, and two vocational schools in Djibouti.

== Government reform ==
In 1999 the government revisited its education policies and launched a consultative process, National Education Forum (Etats Généraux de l’Education), which included all stakeholders (administration, teachers, parents, national assembly, and NGOs). Facing challenges of extremely low enrollments, internal and external inefficiencies, gender and socio-economic inequities, high unit costs and a skewed expenditure structure toward teacher wages, the forum set out an ambitious reform program, aiming to develop an education system that is efficient, financially viable, and responsive to the country's development needs. Building on the consensus and the recommendations, the government developed a Ten-Year Perspective Plan (Schéma Directeur 2000–2010). In August 2000, the government passed a New Education Law (Loi d’orientation du système éducatif) and prepared the Medium-Term Plan 2000-2005 (Plan d’action à moyen terme).

The reform initiative sought to improve the quality of instruction, to increase the role of parents and communities, to introduce competency-based approaches to student learning, and to strengthen the capacity of private and non-formal system to reach youth who were not enrolled, especially girls.

Government strategy covers basic education, vocational education, secondary education, higher education, adult education and, in particular, women's literacy.

== Education finance ==
Public education expenditure as percentage of GDP was 8.6 in 2007, and public expenditure as percentage of government spending was 22.8 in 2007. Share of public expenditure for primary education as percentage of total public education expenditure was 19.0 in 2007. In Djibouti, households play an important part in the financing of education services. Households contribute to education services in two ways: They pay tuition in private schools, and some households spend on books and other pedagogic materials.

== Education system ==
=== Pre-primary ===
Pre-primary education is a two-year education and the first stage of basic education. In pre-primary education, 688 male and 613 female were enrolled in 2008. Gross enrollment rate in pre-primary education was 3.2% for total, 3.3% for males and 3.0% for females in 2008. Gender parity index for gross enrollment rate in pre-primary education was 0.91 in 2008. Private enrollment share in pre-primary education was 89.0% in 2008.

=== Primary ===
Primary education is a five-year education and the second stage of basic education. In primary education, 30,165 male and 26,230 female were enrolled in 2008. Gross enrollment rate in primary education was 55.5% for total, 58.9% for male, and 52.1 for female in 2008. Gross enrollment rate has significantly improved (gross enrollment rate in 2000 was 32.5% for total, 37.5% for male, and 27.4% for female). By constructing new schools and classrooms and offering “school cafeteria” and “school supplies” program, school access and retention by children, particularly for poor rural families, became easier. Gender parity index for gross enrollment rate in primary education was 0.88 in 2008. Private enrollment share in primary education was 13.6% in 2008.

=== Middle education ===
Middle education consists of four years. In middle education, 17,503 male and 12,448 female were enrolled in 2008. Gross enrollment rate in middle education was 37.0% for total, 42.9% for male and 31.0% for female in 2008. Gender parity index for gross enrollment rate in middle education was 0.72 in 2008. Private enrollment share of general education in middle education was 9.7% in 2008.

=== Secondary ===
General education of secondary education consists of three years. In secondary education, 6,905 male and 4,303 female were enrolled in 2008. Gross enrollment rate in secondary education was 19.1% for total, 23.3% for male and 14.8% for female in 2008. Gender parity index for gross enrollment rate in secondary education was 0.63 in 2008. Private enrollment share of general education in secondary education was 22.9% in 2008.

Technical secondary education lasts three years and vocational secondary education lasts two years. Private enrollment share of technical and vocational education was 10.7% in 2006.

=== Tertiary education ===
In tertiary education, 1,306 male and 886 female were enrolled in 2007. Gross enrollment rate in tertiary education was 2.6% for total, 3.1% for male and 2.1% for female in 2007. Gender parity index for gross enrollment rate in tertiary education was 0.69 in 2007.

== Challenges ==
=== Teacher quality ===
In Djibouti, teacher attrition is very high and new teachers are not recruited enough. In addition, the local teacher-training institute is unable to graduate more than 130 teachers per year. Notwithstanding shortage of trained teachers, historically, Djibouti always had a core of well-qualified trained teachers. Nearly all teachers in Djibouti are trained in the highly selective Personnel Training Center for National Education (Centre d’Exécution des Projets education: CFPEN). Most teachers in primary education have a primary level certificate (61%) or a baccalaureat (33%).

=== ICT ===
Djibouti has yet to develop a sector-specific information and communication technologies (ICT) for education policy although ICT has been recognized as a critical tool in modernizing the education sector to meet the diverse human resource demand for the country. The ministry has prioritized capacity-building for teachers in the use of ICT through the National Education and ICT project and the automation of the ministry. The ministry managed to develop several ICT programs.

==== Education Radio Program ====
The National Education Production Information and Research Center develops educational content that is broadcast through Djibouti once a week through its School Radio project to increase access and to improve quality of education. These programs mainly cover secondary school subjects such as mathematics and science in French. Some of the programs are targeted to youth who do not enroll in schools.

=== Education for nomadic people ===
The nomadic population (the Afars and the Somalis) numbers 100,000, which represents one-sixth of the population in Djibouti. Participation rates in education in rural areas were very low (15% for boys and 11% for girls). Parents appear to be open to sending their children to school as they see a bleak future in animal husbandry. The school canteen is a motivation for nomadic families to send their children to school, especially in the poorer areas.

=== Education for All Fast Track Initiative ===
Although Djibouti has improved student access to schools, it is still not on track to meet the MDGs. Djibouti has been eligible for additional external funding, such as the EFA-FTI Catalytic Fund. In the Middle East and North Africa region, Djibouti and Yemen are eligible. (See Education in Yemen.) Eight million USD were allocated in Djibouti, and US$8 million were all disbursed as of September 15, 2009. The Catalytic Fund is a multi-donor trust fund managed by the World Bank on behalf of donors. The purpose of the Catalytic Fund is to provide transitional financial assistance to FTI eligible countries. This fund was established in November 2003.
