= Education in Equatorial Guinea =

Flag for Equatorial Guinea

There have been major strides with Education in Equatorial Guinea over the past ten years, although there is still room for improvement. Among sub-Saharan African countries, Equatorial Guinea has one of the highest literacy rates. According to The World Factbook - Central Intelligence Agency as of 2015, 95.3% of the population age 15 and over can read and write in Equatorial Guinea were respectively literate. Education in Equatorial Guinea is overseen by the Ministry of Education and Science (MEC). Split into four levels, preschool, primary, secondary, and higher education, the Equatorial Guinea's educational system only deems preschool and primary school mandatory. Education in Equatorial Guinea is free and compulsory until the age of 14. Although it has a high GNI per capita, which, as of 2018, was 18,170 international dollars, its educational outcomes fall behind those of the rest of West and Central Africa. In 1993, the gross primary enrollment rate was 149.7 percent, and the net primary enrollment rate was 83.4 percent. Late entry into the school system and high dropout rates are common, and girls are more likely than boys to drop out of school. As of 2015, the net enrollment rates for each education level are as follows: 42 percent for preschool, between 60 percent and 86 percent for primary school, and 43.6 percent for secondary school. UNESCO has cited several issues with the current educational system, including poor nutrition, low quality of teachers, and lack of adequate facilities.

== History ==
During the period of colonization, Equatorial Guinea's educational system was mostly controlled by Catholic missionary groups, in particular the Claretians. Schools run by the Spanish government encouraged the use of the Spanish language to communicate. During this period, school attendance was above 90%, which was one of the highest attendance rates on the continent. Upon independence, Equatorial Guinea also had one of the highest literacy rates on the continent. However, the educational system quickly deteriorated because there were fewer funds available. In addition to the lack of funding, the educational system suffered because President Macías viewed the Catholic church as a rival for power and as a symbol of Spanish imperialism. He made Catholic activities illegal in 1978 and closed down Catholic schools. As Teodoro Obiang Nguema Mbasogo took over the presidency, the education system stabilized. He placed a higher emphasis on the system by creating new schools and rehabilitating old ones. Although the country's income rose after the discovery of oil deposits in the 1990s, Equatorial Guinea's budget still only allocated about 2-3 percent to health and education. This figure stands far below the Sub-Saharan average of 16% of government budget. The current education system is still quite new, as a 2007 law deemed education fundamental for all citizens and the country began to follow international standards.

== Primary and Secondary Education ==
The quality of schooling is low, along with poor outcomes. More than seventy percent of first grade students were classified as Low Achievement in 2011. Additionally, it is hard to track outcomes, as there are no national assessments. The poor quality of schooling can be attributed to low teacher qualification levels, poor physical conditions, and lack of access to materials. There is also a high rate of grade repetition and dropout, as well as a lack of effective monitoring.

Primary school is considered mandatory and is free of charge. Primary school enrollment has fallen over the past 30 years, with a peak of 177.582 percent gross enrollment in 1984 to the current gross enrollment rate of 61.775 percent. Nearly 45 percent of students drop out of primary school. At the primary school level, enrollment is relatively equal across different income quintiles. Upon completion of the primary level, students take a test to receive the Certification of Primary Studies, which determines whether a student should continue to the secondary level or opt for professional training.

Secondary education is voluntary, covering six years. The majority of Equatoguineans do not receive secondary education. Access is much lower, and inequalities are evident, as the richest quintile is enrolled at four times the rate of the poorest. Currently, the Program for Education Development in Equatorial Guinea (PRODEGE), funded by President Obiang, Trident Energy, and Kosmos Energy, is focused on improving the education of secondary students. This is part of the second phase of its ten-year plan.

== Higher Education ==
Equatorial Guinea has placed a much larger emphasis on the funding of higher education than on the funding for primary and secondary schooling. In fact, the amount spent on higher education is fifty times that of primary education. Facilities for Equatorial Guinea's higher education are largely assisted by the Spanish National University of Distant Education. Equatorial Guinea's government boasts that more than 500,000 students received scholarships to study at universities, participate in professional training programs, and participate in technical training programs abroad over the past forty years. In order to be able to attend a university program, students must take a selectivity test. The National University of Equatorial Guinea is the primary institute of higher learning. The adult literacy rate for 2014 was estimated at 95 percent, with 98 percent for youth 15-24 year old, the highest in sub-saharan Africa.

=== Universities and Colleges ===
- National University of Equatorial Guinea
- Colegio Nacional Enrique Nvó Okenve, Malabo and Bata
