= Education in Tonga =

Education in Tonga is compulsory for children through the end of high school. In 1995, the gross primary enrolment rate was 122.2 percent, and the net primary enrolment rate was 95.3 percent. Primary school attendance rates were unavailable for Tonga as of 2001. While enrolment rates indicate a level of commitment to education, they do not always reflect children's participation in school. 98.5% of students in Tonga attend schools while the other 2% are either living in remote areas without certain schools, such as in the Niua group, or they do not have enough funds to pay for their enrolment. There are about twenty institutions for higher education (including universities), 22 high schools, and around 95 primary schools including pre-schools in different villages around Tonga.

Tongans have one of the highest rates of PhDs per head of population and are proud of the body of academic knowledge created by Tongan scholars. A collection of every PhD and Masters dissertation written by any Tongan, the Kukū Kaunaka Collection, is held at the University of the South Pacific and administered by Seuʻula Johansson-Fua.

The Human Rights Measurement Initiative (HRMI) finds that Tonga is fulfilling only 94.0% of what it should be fulfilling for the right to education based on the country's level of income. HRMI breaks down the right to education by looking at the rights to both primary education and secondary education. While taking into consideration Tonga's income level, the nation is achieving 98.1% of what should be possible based on its resources (income) for primary education but only 90.0% for secondary education.

Education in Tonga is primarily managed by the Ministry of Education and Training. The education system in Tonga follows a structure similar to many Commonwealth countries, consisting of primary, secondary, and tertiary education.

== See also ==
- Schools in Tonga
- Educational Institutions in Tonga
