= Education in Georgia (country) =

Ministry of Education, Science and Youth of Georgia

General details
- Primary languages: Georgian; Azerbaijani; Armenian; Russian
- Primary: Gross: 88.2% (1996); Net: 87% (1996)

Education in Georgia is free of charge and compulsory for eight years, from the age of 6 until the age of 14. Children in Georgia are legally required to have a basic primary education. Even though education is not compulsory for children who are older than 14, most adolescents in the country are expected to stay in school for a total of 12 years, until they are 17 or 18 years old, primarily so that they can complete their education. In 1996, the gross primary enrollment rate was 88.2%, and the net primary enrollment rate was 87%; 48.8% are girls and 51.8% are boys. The constitution mandates that education is free. Related expenses that include textbooks and laptops are provided by the state free of charge; in 2001, there were 47,837 children not attending primary school.

The Human Rights Measurement Initiative (HRMI) finds that Georgia is fulfilling only 94.3% of what it should be fulfilling for the right to education based on the country's level of income. HRMI breaks down the right to education by looking at the rights to both primary education and secondary education. While taking into consideration Georgia's income level, the nation is achieving 90.7% of what should be possible based on its resources (income) for primary education and 97.8% for secondary education.

== Languages ==
Most schools teach in the Georgian language, however there are more than 300 Azerbaijani, Russian, and Armenian-language schools in Georgia. Most of these schools are in the regions of Samtskhe-Javakheti and Kvemo Kartli.

== See also ==
- List of universities in Georgia
