= Education in Turkmenistan =

The Ministry of Education of Turkmenistan is responsible for Education in Turkmenistan at all levels.

== History ==
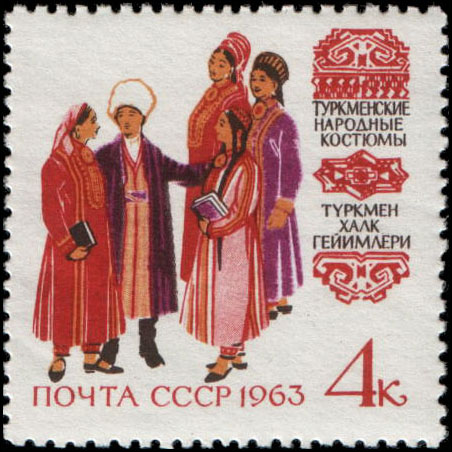
Soviet stamp showing Turkmen costume (1963); the women are depicted holding books, a subtle promotion of women's education

Turkmenistan has 12 years of formal secondary education. Higher education now lasts 5 years. In 2007, there were 1 million children attending secondary schools and around 100,000 started grade 1. In the 2010/2011 academic year, 931,272 students were enrolled in general educational institutions: 373,160 in urban areas and 558,112 in rural areas. There was a total of 1,730 schools – 1,232 in rural and 498 in urban areas (State Committee for Statistics). Some 69,437 teachers were employed. Turkmenistan introduced "12 year Secondary Education Program" in 2012, which is being implemented starting from 2013/2014 academic year.

At the end of the 2019–20 academic year, nearly 80,000 Turkmen pupils graduated from high school. As of the 2019–20 academic year, 12,242 of these students were admitted to institutions of higher education in Turkmenistan. An additional 9,063 were admitted to the country's 42 vocational colleges.

== Course centers ==
In 1996, the Ministry of Education of Turkmenistan gave the opportunity for state and private entities to open and operate short term courses.

Currently, a number of state and private-owned course centers are operating in Turkmenistan. They mainly provide courses in language, computer skills, mathematics and accounting. They work on license base given by the Ministry of Education.

== Universities ==
There are 23 higher education institutions in Turkmenistan. 18 of these are civil and 5 are military higher education institutions.

Some of the higher education institutions are Turkmen State University named after Magtymguly, State Institute of World Languages named after Döwletmämmet Azady, University of Agriculture named after S. A. Niýazow, State Institute of Economy & Management, Institute of Education named after Seýitnazar Seýdi (Turkmenabat), Institute of Electrical Technology (Mary city), State Medical University.

There are 3 international higher education institutions operating in Turkmenistan: International Oil & Gas University, International Relations Institute of Foreign Affairs Ministry of Turkmenistan, International University of Humanities and Development. Despite their "international" naming, they are attended only by Turkmen students.

Military-based higher education institutions: Institute of Ministry of Defence, Institute of Internal Affairs Ministry (alias Police Academy), Institute of Ministry of National Security, Institute of State Border Security.

In June 2021 a new Law on Education was adopted, according to which institutions of higher education are allowed to charge fees for tuition. The government of Turkmenistan has not published a specific date for institutions to shift from free to paid tuition, but some observers anticipate free university tuition will be abolished by 2024. The 2020 national education plan called for "step-by-step transfer of institutions of higher education to self-support with paid tuition."

== Postgraduate education ==
Postgraduate education in Turkmenistan is available at the Turkmen Academy of Sciences, having been restored in 2007. The quota for a postgraduate education is approved by the President of Turkmenistan. In 2013, the graduate school will accept 55 graduates of national universities. Two more budget places will appear in doctoral studies, forty-two in clinical residency, one place will be available for one of 241 candidates for a 'candidate of sciences' degree, nine places for a doctoral degree.
