= Validation of foreign studies and degrees =

Recognition of qualifications from a foreign country

The validation or recognition of foreign studies and degrees is the process whereby a competent authority in one country formally recognises the value of a qualification from a foreign country. This can entail total or partial validation of foreign university and non-university studies, degrees and other qualifications. Particularly within Europe, this is covered by a number of international conventions and agreements.

The first generation of recognition conventions was developed under the auspices of UNESCO in the 1970s and 1980s, with conventions covering Latin America and the Caribbean (1974), the Mediterranean (1976), the Arab States (1978), Europe (1979), Africa (1981), and Asia and the Pacific (1983). These conventions are specifically concerned with recognition of qualifications rather than equivalence – there is no attempt to build frameworks with automatic equivalence of qualifications. This first generation of conventions has been built on by second generation conventions, starting with Lisbon (1997) covering Europe and now including the Asia-Pacific region (Tokyo, 2011) and Africa (Addis Ababa, 2014). A major change with the more recent conventions is a shift in favour of recognition, with the burden being to show substantial differences.

The Lisbon Convention entered into force in 1999, the Tokyo Convention in 2018 and the Addis Ababa Convention in 2019. A new regional convention covering Latin America and the Caribbean was adopted in Buenos Aires in 2019 but has not, as of February 2020, entered into force. The first recognition treaty with a global scope, the Global Convention on the Recognition of Higher Education Qualifications, was adopted by the 40th session of UNESCO's General Conference in November 2019. It entered into force in on 5 March 2023, three months after receiving its 20th ratification.

== Global ==
The Global Convention on the Recognition of Higher Education Qualifications is the first recognition treaty with global scope. It was adopted by the 40th session of UNESCO's General Conference in November 2019 and entered into force in on 5 March 2023, three months after receiving its 20th ratification.

This built on the work of earlier regional recognition conventions. It covers both higher education qualifications and qualifications giving access to higher education. Rights under the convention include having qualifications assessed for entry to higher education or to seek employment in a manner that is "fair, non-discriminatory and transparent" and "based on appropriate, reliable, accessible and up-to-date information". Recognition of qualifications must be given unless substantial differences can be demonstrated (this means differences "which would most likely prevent the applicant from succeeding in a desired activity, such as, but not limited to, further study, research activities, or employment opportunities"), and "with due respect for the diversity of higher-education systems worldwide". There must also be reasonable procedures in place for recognising the qualifications of displaced people and refugees who do not have documentation. Each country must also have an "objective and reliable system for the approval, recognition and quality assurance of its higher-education institutions".

== United Arab Emirates ==
In the United Arab Emirates, recognition of foreign educational qualifications is administered by the UAE Ministry of Education through an Equivalency Certificate process, known formally as the University Certificate Recognition programme. Foreign degree holders in regulated professions including healthcare, engineering, and teaching are required to obtain an equivalency certificate confirming their qualification meets UAE educational standards before they can be licensed to practise. This is a prerequisite for licensing through the [[Dubai Health Authority]] (DHA), [[Ministry of Health and Prevention (United Arab Emirates)|Ministry of Health]] (MOH), and the Knowledge and Human Development Authority (KHDA). The process involves verification through the DataFlow Group, a credential verification company designated by UAE licensing authorities.

== Europe ==
=== Lisbon Convention ===
Mutual recognition of higher education qualifications is enshrined in the UNESCO/Council of Europe Lisbon Recognition Convention, which covers (as of February 2017) all Council of Europe members except Monaco and Greece, as well as Australia, Belarus, Holy See, Israel, Kazakhstan, Kyrghyz Republic, New Zealand and Tajikistan. The convention has also been signed, but not ratified, by Canada and the United States. Within these countries, qualifications must be recognised as equivalent unless proven otherwise, and assessments must be carried out fairly and within a reasonable time.

The convention established the European Network of Information Centres (ENIC), supplementing and expanding the National Academic Recognition Information Centre (NARIC) network established by the European Union in 1984. The ENIC-NARIC network comprises national centres for validation of degrees in member countries.

=== European Higher Education Area ===
The European Higher Education Area consists (as of February 2017) of 48 national members (who must be signatories of the European Cultural Convention) and the European Union. It aims to promote mutual recognition of academic qualifications through alignment of national qualifications frameworks, via the Bologna Process's short cycle, first cycle (bachelor's degree), second cycle (master's degree) and third cycle (doctoral degree) framework, the European Credit Transfer and Accumulation System, and the use of Diploma Supplements.

=== European Qualifications Framework ===
The European Qualifications Framework (EQF) is an initiative of the European Commission to provide a "translation" for national qualifications frameworks at all levels (not just higher education) and so support mobility of workers within the European Union. It originally covered the 28 EU states plus Lichtenstein and Norway, but has been opened to non-EU states, with Australia, New Zealand and Hong Kong currently going through referencing of their national frameworks to the EQF.

=== Mutual recognition of professional qualifications in the European Union ===
Mutual recognition of professional qualifications is regulated by European Union Directive 2005/36/EC of the European Parliament and of the Council of 7 September 2005 on the recognition of professional qualifications, modified by Council Directive 2006/100/EC.

Procedure:

1. The competent authority of the host Member State shall acknowledge receipt of the application within one month of receipt and inform the applicant of any missing document.
2. The procedure for examining an application for authorisation to practise a regulated profession must be completed as quickly as possible and lead to a duly substantiated decision by the competent authority in the host Member State in any case within three months after the date on which the applicant's complete file was submitted. However, this deadline may be extended by one month in certain cases.
3. The decision, or failure to reach a decision within the deadline, shall be subject to appeal under national law.

== Validation in individual countries ==
=== Norway ===
The Norwegian governmental authority for accreditation of foreign education of Norwegian citizens and foreigners, NOKUT, has sole power in these matters.

=== Spain ===
The total validation of foreign university studies and degrees in the Spanish system consists of a complete recognition of said studies and degrees in that system. The Spanish Ministry of Education and Science is in charge of the procedure.

The academic degrees, diplomas or certificates on pharmaceutical or medical specialities which were obtained in a foreign country and which qualify the applicant in order to carry out the relevant professions in those countries can be validated as their official equivalents in the Spanish system.

The Ministry of Education and Science is only responsible for the total validation of a foreign university degree for its Spanish equivalent. Any other applications for the partial validation of studies carried out in a foreign country in order to pursue a university study course in Spain must be submitted to the Spanish university itself.

=== United States ===
The US government does not have a specified agency for recognition and validation of foreign qualifications. Instead, responsibility falls on universities and colleges to determine the equivalence for students they admit, on employers for people they employ and on state licensing board for entry into regulated professions. These bodies may carry out assessment themselves, or contract a private credential evaluation service.

Credential evaluation is also important for H-1B visas, which require a bachelor's degree or equivalent, and for some categories of permanent resident. For H-1Bs, but not permanent resident applications, experience can be counted towards equivalence at the rate of three years of experience equals one year of education.

== See also ==
- Academic certificate
- Educational accreditation
- Authenticated copy
- Diploma mill
- Doctoral thesis
- Academic degree
  - Bachelor's degree
  - Engineering degree
- Legalization (of a document)
