= Transcript (education) =

Inventory of the courses taken and grades earned

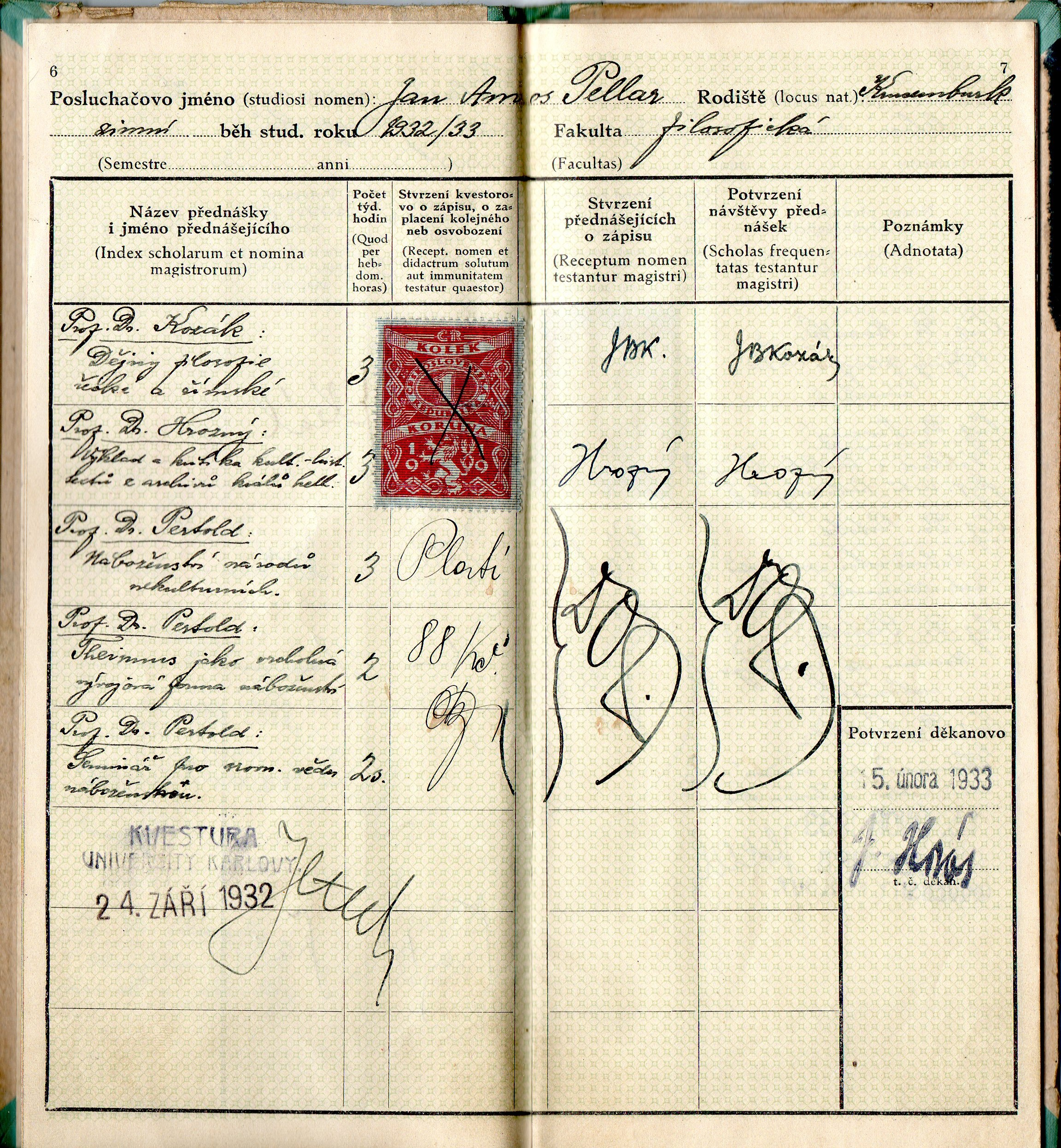
A 1933 transcript from Charles University, Prague

In education, a transcript is a certified record (inventory) of a student throughout a course of study having full enrollment history including all courses (or subjects) attempted, grades earned and degrees and awards conferred.

== Synonyms ==
A transcript is sometimes referred to as a marksheet, marklist or report card.

In the United States, a transcript is also called Cumulative Record File (CRF), permanent record, or simply record.

In the European ECTS system, transcripts are called Transcript of Records (ToR).

== United States ==
In United States education, a transcript is a copy of a student's permanent academic record, which usually means all courses taken, all grades received, all honors received and degrees conferred to a student from the first day of school to the current school year for high school, college and university. A transcript may also contain the student’s rank in class and the accreditation of the institution issuing the transcript.

An official transcript is prepared and sent by the issuing school usually by the registrar with an original signature of a school official on the school letterhead and is sealed by the school. When students change schools, or seek admission to a college or university, the official transcript is usually mailed from school to school. Official transcripts can also be issued electronically through approved secure sites such as National Student Clearinghouse and Parchment. Transcripts usually consist of grades 9-12 when applying to college.

=== Holding transcripts ===
Colleges and universities which believe that they are owed money by a former student may "hold" the student's transcript until they are paid. This may mean that former student cannot resume their education elsewhere. Many colleges and universities will not allow a prospective student until receiving communication (in the form of a physical stamp or seal) that the prior school is satisfied with its debt collection. If the college or university discovers that an applicant lied on their college application, the college can rescind the offer of admission, can revoke the student's degree, if completed, and refuse the release of that student's transcripts.

=== Legal aspects ===
In the United States, release of information from an official transcript without consent to a third party is prohibited by the Family Educational Rights and Privacy Act of 1974. Alteration of a transcript is considered a felony in most states.

== European Union ==
In the European ECTS system, a Transcript of Records (ToR) is used to document the performance of a student over a certain period of time by listing the course units or modules taken, the credits gained, and the grades awarded. The Transcript of Records provides a standard format for recording all study activities carried out by students. It is an essential tool for academic recognition.

Transcript of Records and Diploma Supplements are a fairly recent development in most European countries. Students who obtained academic degrees in Europe prior to the Bologna Process of 1999 typically will not have received transcripts or diploma supplements and they cannot be produced retroactively for these students. Even today there are still European universities that are not ready to issue Transcripts or Diploma Supplements. Unlike in the US, there does not typically exist in Europe a system of schools directly mailing transcripts to other schools, something that also would be problematic in view of European privacy laws.

The ECTS Transcript of Records, created as part of the Bologna Process, preferably includes, along with the local grades, the ECTS grades of the student. It is used for mobile students at two separate moments. First, it must be issued and sent to the host institution by the home institution for all outgoing students before their departure in order to provide information about the course units/modules that they already have completed and the results obtained. Secondly it must be issued and sent by the host institution to the home institution for all incoming students at the end of their period of study.

== Transcript fraud ==
Transcript fraud is the alteration of a transcript issued by a legitimate school or university or the forgery of completely fake transcripts and is considered a felony. Transcript fraud is a growing problem for both educational institutions and employers. This is related to diploma fraud, which is the forgery of school or university diplomas.

== See also ==
- Diploma Supplement
