= Higher education =

Academic tertiary education

Higher education, also called post-secondary education, third-level or tertiary education, is an optional final stage of formal learning that occurs after completion of secondary education. This consists of universities, colleges and polytechnics that offer formal degrees beyond high school or secondary school education.

== Definition ==
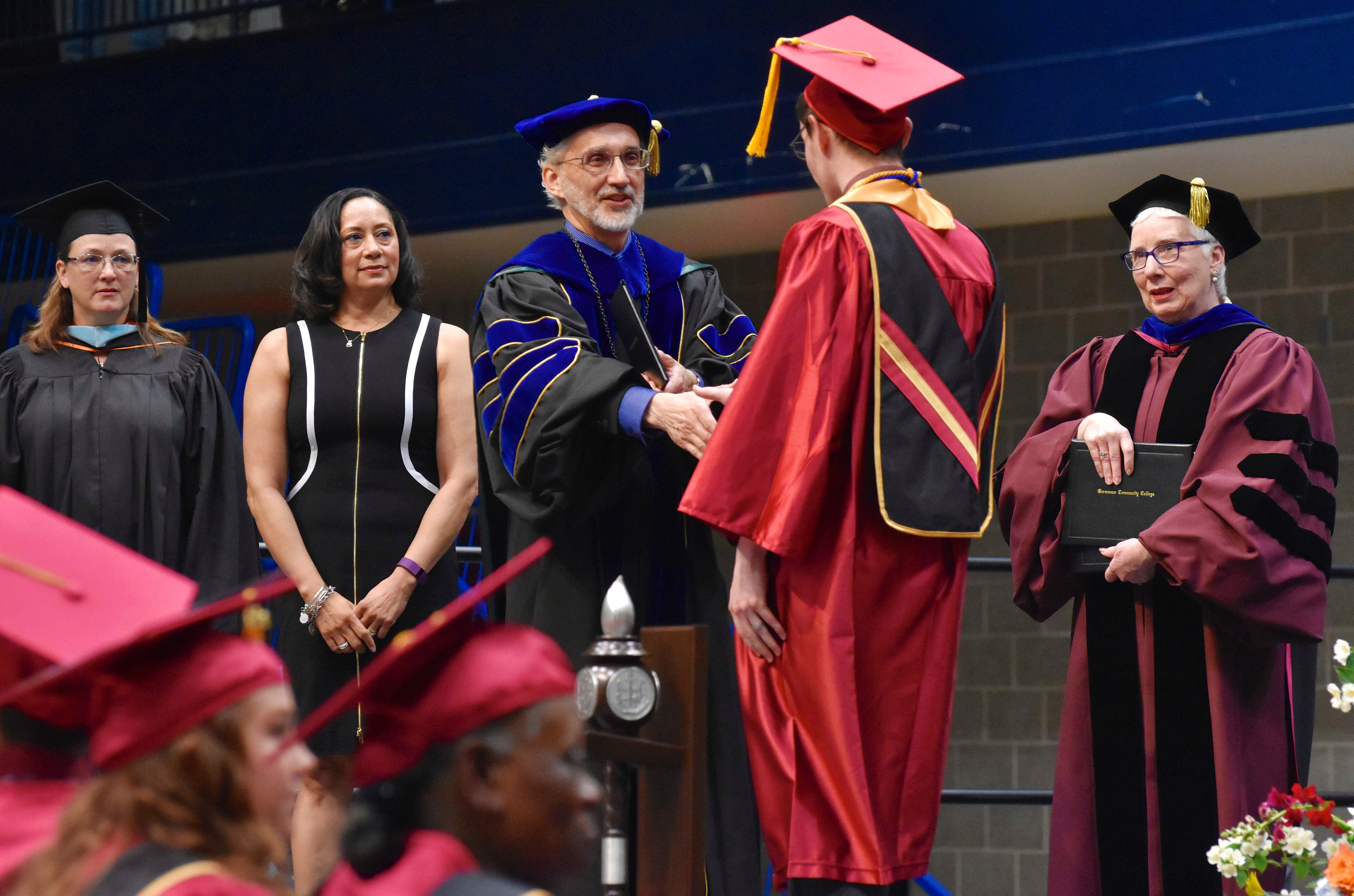
A post-secondary graduate receives a diploma during a graduation ceremony at Germanna Community College in Virginia.

The 1997 version of the International Standard Classification of Education (ISCED) classified all taught higher education as level 5 and doctoral studies as level 6. In the 2011 version, this was refined and expanded into sub-bachelor's higher education (level 5), bachelor's degree-level (level 6), master's degree-level (level 7) and doctoral-level (level 8).

In the days when few pupils progressed beyond primary education or basic education, the term "higher education" was often used to refer to secondary education, which can create some confusion. (Note: For example, Higher Education: General and Technical, a 1933 National Union of Teachers pamphlet by Lord Eustace Percy, which is actually about secondary education and uses the two terms interchangeably.) This is the origin of the term high school for various schools for children between the ages of 14 and 18 (United States) or 11 and 18 (United Kingdom and Australia).

== History ==
pr anx pr
House of Life
'library'
in hieroglyphs

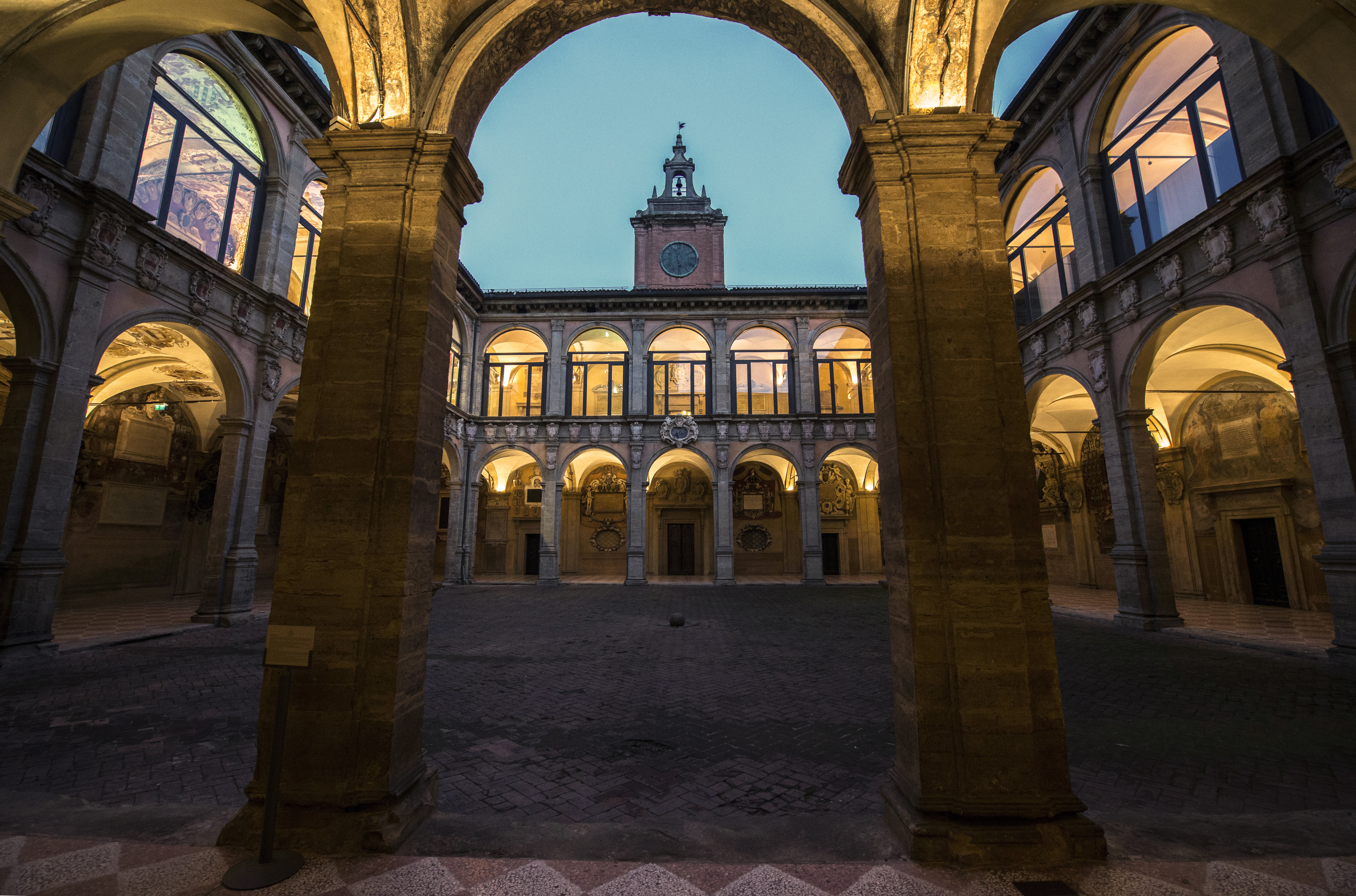
Bologna University in Italy, established in 1088 A.D., is the world's oldest university in continuous operation.

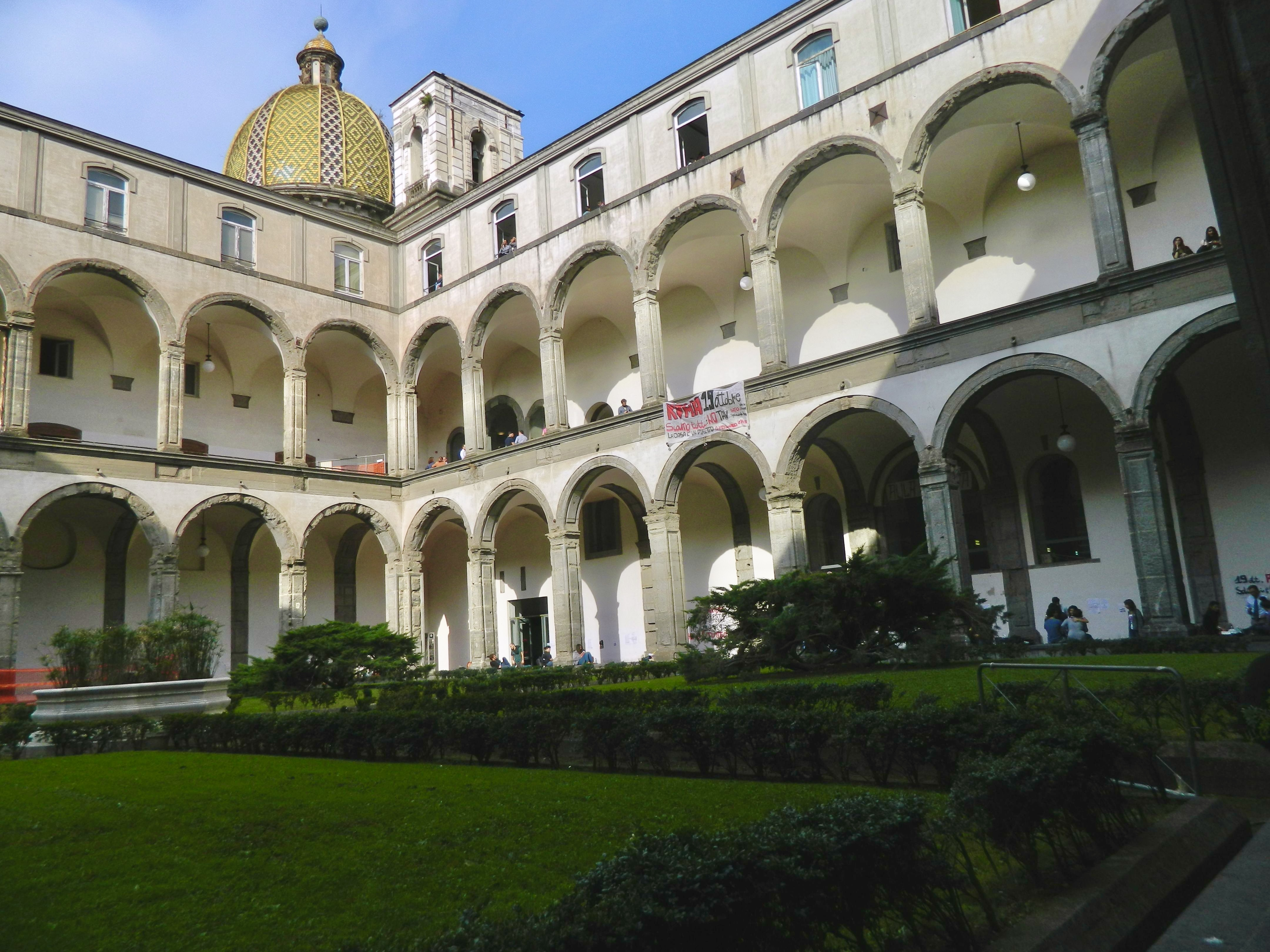
Established in 1224 by Frederick II, Holy Roman Emperor, University of Naples Federico II in Italy is the world's oldest state-funded university in continuous operation.

The oldest known institutions of higher education are credited to Dynastic Egypt, with Pr-Anx (houses of life) built as libraries and scriptoriums, containing works on law, architecture, mathematics, and medicine, and involved in the training of "swnw" and "swnwt" (male and female medical practitioners); extant Egyptian papyri from the 3rd millennium BC are in several collections.

In the Greek world, Plato's Academy (c. 387–86 BCE), Aristotle's Lyceum (c. 334–86 BCE) and other philosophical-mathematical schools became models for other establishments, particularly in Alexandria of Egypt, under the Ptolemies.

In South Asia, the city of Taxila, later the great Buddhist monastery of Nalanda (c. 427–1197 CE), attracted students and professors even from distant regions.

In China, the Han dynasty established chairs to teach the Five Confucean Classics in the Grand School, Taixue (c. 3–1905 CE), to train cadres for the imperial administration. All these higher-learning institutions became models for other schools within their sphere of cultural influence.

In 425 CE, the Byzantine emperor Theodosius II innovated by establishing the Pandidakterion to train public servants, with a faculty of 31 professors. In the 7th and 8th centuries, "cathedral schools" were created in Western Europe. Meanwhile, the first Madrasahs were founded in the Muslim empires. They began as primary schools on the premises of major mosques, but gradually evolved into secondary schools and centres of higher education. However, these schools cannot be classified as universities because their organisation and purposes were markedly different from the corporations of students and teachers, independent of both the Church and the State, which established themselves from the 12th century in Western Europe as Universitas Studiorum.

Guinness World Records names the University of al-Qarawiyyin in Fez, Morocco, as the oldest existing and continually operating higher-learning institution in the world, and it is occasionally referred to as the oldest university by scholars. However, there are older institutions of higher education, such as the University of Ez-Zitouna in Montfleury, Tunis, which was first established in 737. The University of Bologna, Italy, founded around 1088, is the world's oldest university (using a strict definition) in continuous operation and the first university in the sense of a higher-learning and degree-awarding institute, as the word universitas was coined at its foundation.

=== 20th century ===
Since World War II, developed and many developing countries have increased the participation of the age group who mostly studies higher education from the elite rate, of up to 15 per cent, to the mass rate of 16 to 50 per cent. In many developed countries, participation in higher education has continued to increase towards universal or, what Trow later called, open access, where over half of the relevant age group participate in higher education. Higher education is important to national economies, both as an industry, in its own right, and as a source of trained and educated personnel for the rest of the economy. College educated workers have commanded a measurable wage premium and are much less likely to become unemployed than less educated workers.

=== 21st century ===
In recent years, universities have been criticized for permitting or actively encouraging grade inflation. Widening participation can increase the supply of graduates in individual fields of study over the demand for their skills, aggravating graduate unemployment, underemployment, overqualification and educational inflation. Some commentators have suggested that the impact of the COVID-19 pandemic on education is rapidly making certain aspects of the traditional higher education system obsolete. The Israeli-funded Institute for the Study of Global Antisemitism and Policy and some Israeli media have claimed that involvement and funding by Qatar in higher education in the US has resulted in what they regard as growing anti-Semitism on campuses, particularly in connection to Gaza war protests.

== Effects ==
Higher education graduates are likely to have different worldviews and moral values than non-graduates. Graduates are also more likely to embrace cultural and ethnic diversity and express more positive views towards minority groups. For international relationships, graduates are more likely to favor openness, supporting policies like free trade, open borders, and more liberal policies regarding international migration.

Universities and higher education have been linked to increases in human capital, economic growth, and higher wages, as well as reductions in poverty. A 2025 study found evidence suggesting that those who attend college are less prone to indoctrination. Cost-benefit calculation indicate that government investment in higher education results in net fiscal benefits.

== International recognition ==
Higher education qualifications from one country can be validated in another country after credential evaluation. This may be covered by bilateral recognition agreements between states, by regional UNESCO conventions such as the Lisbon Recognition Convention, or by UNESCO's Global Convention on the Recognition of Qualifications concerning Higher Education. UNESCO conventions rely on the principle of granting recognition unless there are "substantial differences" between the foreign qualification and its domestic equivalent, putting the burden of proof on the recognition authority to prove a. substantial difference rather than on the graduate to prove equivalence.

== Statistics ==
Percentage of 25–29-year-olds who have completed at least four years of tertiary education, by wealth, selected countries, 2008–2014

Globally, the gross enrollment rate in higher education (referred to as tertiary education in international statistics) increased from 19% in 2000 to 38% in 2017. The tertiary gross enrollment ratio ranges from 9% in low-income countries to 77% in high-income countries, which, after rapid growth in the 2000s, reached a plateau in the 2010s. Since 1990s, men are underrepresented among tertiary education students in most developed countries.

Between 2017 and 2030, the biggest increase in tertiary enrollment ratios was expected to be in middle-income countries, where it was predicted to reach 52%. Sustainable Development Goal 4 (SDG 4) commits countries to providing lifelong learning opportunities for all, including higher education. This commitment is monitored through the global indicator for target 4.3 in SDG 4, which measures the participation rate of youth and adults in formal and non-formal education and training in the previous 12 months, whether for work or non-work purposes. The right of access to higher education is mentioned in a number of international human rights instruments. The UN International Covenant on Economic, Social and Cultural Rights of 1966 declares in Article 13 that "higher education shall be made equally accessible to all, on the basis of capacity, by every appropriate means, and in particular by the progressive introduction of free education". In Europe, Article 2 of the First Protocol to the European Convention on Human Rights, adopted in 1950, obliges all signatory parties to guarantee the right to education. University completion rates for students with disabilities are much lower compared to completion rates of students without disabilities.

The total expenditure on higher education institutions (ISCED levels 5 to 8) as a percentage of GDP for individual countries is shown in the following table.

Country	Tertiary Education expenditure as % of GDP 2020
Australia	1.9
Austria	1.8
Belgium	1.6
Bulgaria	1.2
Canada	2.4
Chile	2.7
Colombia	1.5
Costa Rica	1.6
Croatia	1.2
Czech Republic	1.1
Denmark	1.9
Estonia	1.5
Finland	1.6
France	1.6
Germany	1.3
Greece	0.9
Hungary	0.9
Iceland	1.4
Ireland	0.8
Israel	1.4
Italy	1.0
Japan	1.4
Latvia	1.4
Lithuania	1.2
Luxembourg	0.5
Mexico	1.2
Netherlands	1.8
New Zealand	1.6
Norway	2.0
Poland	1.3
Portugal	1.3
Romania	0.8
Slovakia	1.1
Slovenia	1.2
South Korea	1.5
Spain	1.5
Sweden	1.6
Turkey	1.5
United Kingdom	1.5
United States of America	2.5

The percentage of adults who have attained individual tertiary education levels by country is shown in the following table.

Country	Ages 25–64: % attaining a tertiary degree course equivalent to at least:			
Country	Any tertiary	Bachelor's	Master's	Doctoral
Argentina	24.8			1.4
Australia	51.5	39.4	10.9	1.9
Austria	35.6	20.4	14.8	1.2
Belgium	45.8	45.0	20.1	1.1
Brazil	21.0	21.0	1.0	0.3
Bulgaria	29.8	29.8	20.4	0.3
Canada	62.7			
Chile	31.4			
China	18.5			
Colombia	28.3			
Costa Rica	25.3			
Czech Republic	26.7	26.5	19.7	0.7
Denmark	42.1	37.0	16.3	1.5
Estonia	42.1	36.5	21.8	0.8
Finland	42.6	35.1	17.3	1.3
France	41.6	27.2	15.2	1.0
Germany	32.5	31.9	13.6	1.9
Greece	35.1	34.7	9.3	0.9
Hungary	29.4	28.5	13.9	0.5
India	12.9	12.9	3.4	3.4
Indonesia	13.1	10.3	0.8	0.0
Iceland	43.6	39.4	18.1	1.2
Ireland	54.4	44.3	16.6	1.7
Israel	50.6	39.6	15.2	1.2
Italy	20.3	20.2	14.6	0.6
Japan	56.1			
Latvia	39.5	35.1	18.4	0.4
Lithuania	46.5	46.5	16.5	0.8
Luxembourg	51.5	46.6	31.4	2.9
Mexico	20.6	20.1	1.9	0.1
Netherlands	44.7	42.4	18.2	1.2
New Zealand	39.8	35.8	6.3	1.1
Norway	48.1	36.5	15.4	1.5
Poland	33.9	33.8	26.2	0.8
Portugal	31.5	31.2	21.7	0.9
Romania	19.7			
Slovakia	29.2	29.1	25.3	0.9
Slovenia	40.1	31.7	20.1	3.7
South Korea	52.8			
South Africa	13.9			
Spain	41.1	28.5	17.2	0.8
Sweden	48.5	38.7	18.7	2.0
Switzerland	44.7	44.7	20.0	3.2
Turkey	25.0	18.3	2.3	0.4
United Kingdom	51.3	42.3	15.8	1.7
United States of America	50.0	39.4	14.4	2.1

A 2014 report by the Organisation for Economic Co-operation and Development stated that, by 2014, 84% of young people in high-income countries were completing upper secondary education (which, in the OECD definition, includes further education and some other non-higher-education tertiary education) over their lifetimes. People who went on to higher education were earning twice as much as median workers. Additionally, access to education was expanding and growth in the number of people receiving university education was rising sharply. By 2014, close to 40% of people aged 25–34 (and around 25 percent of those aged 55–64), were being educated at university.

== By country ==
=== Canada ===
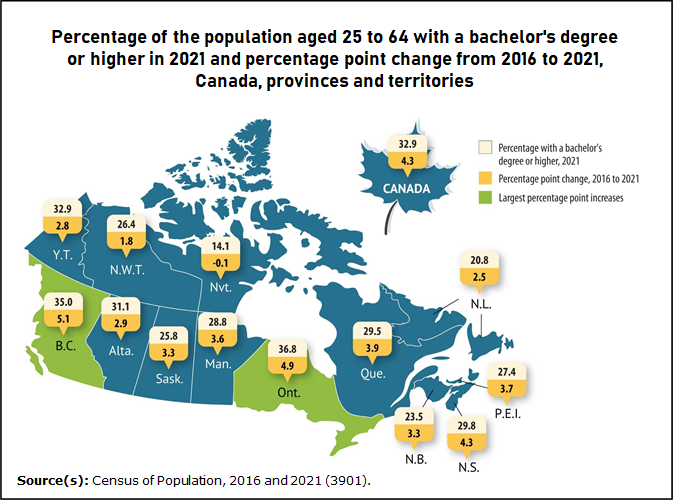
Canada by province and territory, showing the percentage of the population aged 25 to 64 who had a bachelor's degree or higher, and the percentage point change from 2016 to 2021

Higher education in Canada includes provincial, territorial, Indigenous and military higher education systems. The ideal objective of Canadian higher education is to offer every Canadian the opportunity to acquire the skills and knowledge necessary to realize their utmost potential. It aspires to cultivate a world-class workforce, enhance the employment rate of Canadians, and safeguard Canada's enduring prosperity. Higher education programs are designed with the perspective of the learner in focus, to mitigate risks and assure definite outcomes.

=== Hong Kong ===
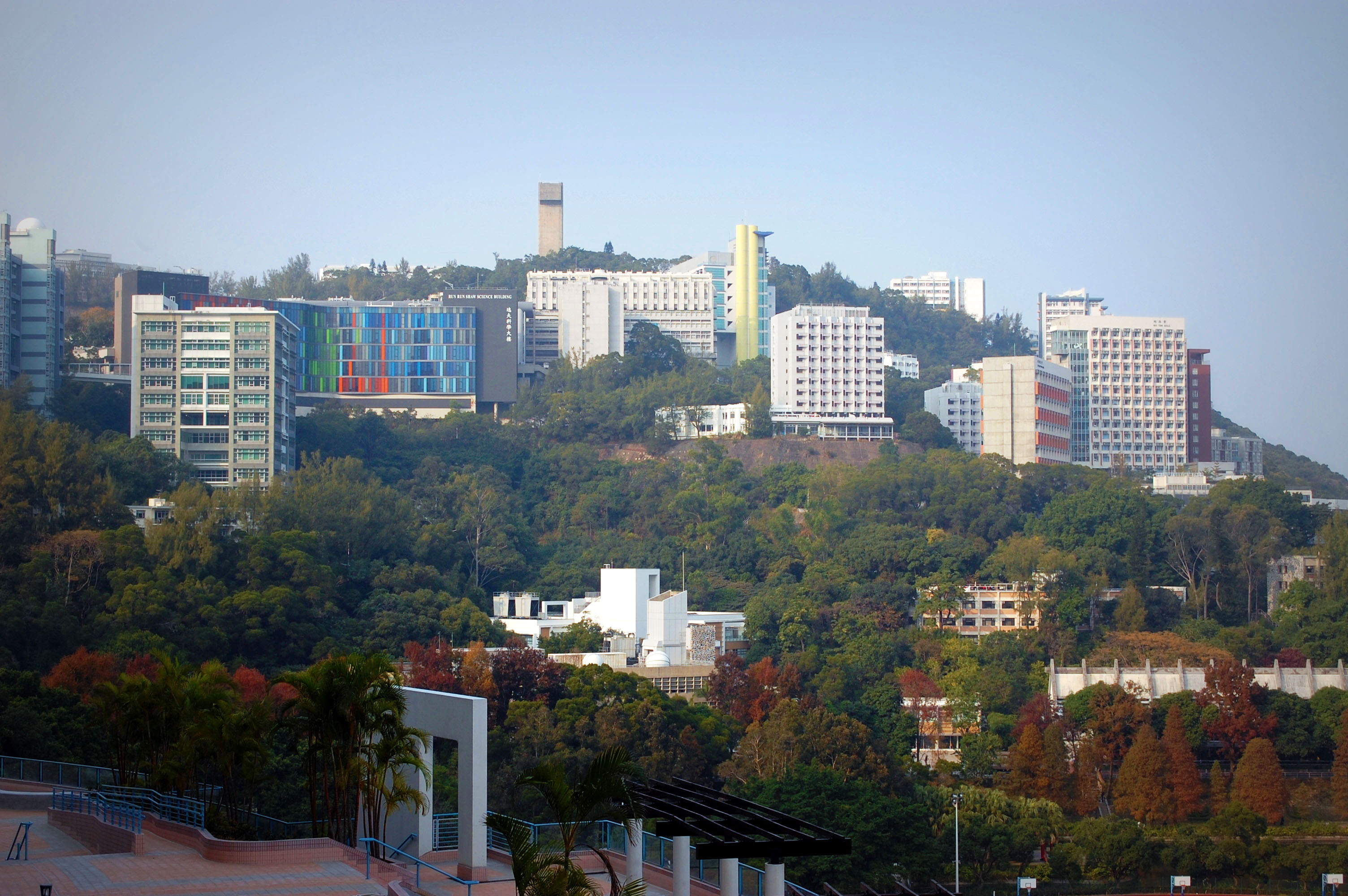
Chinese University of Hong Kong, one of Hong Kong's universities

=== Italy ===
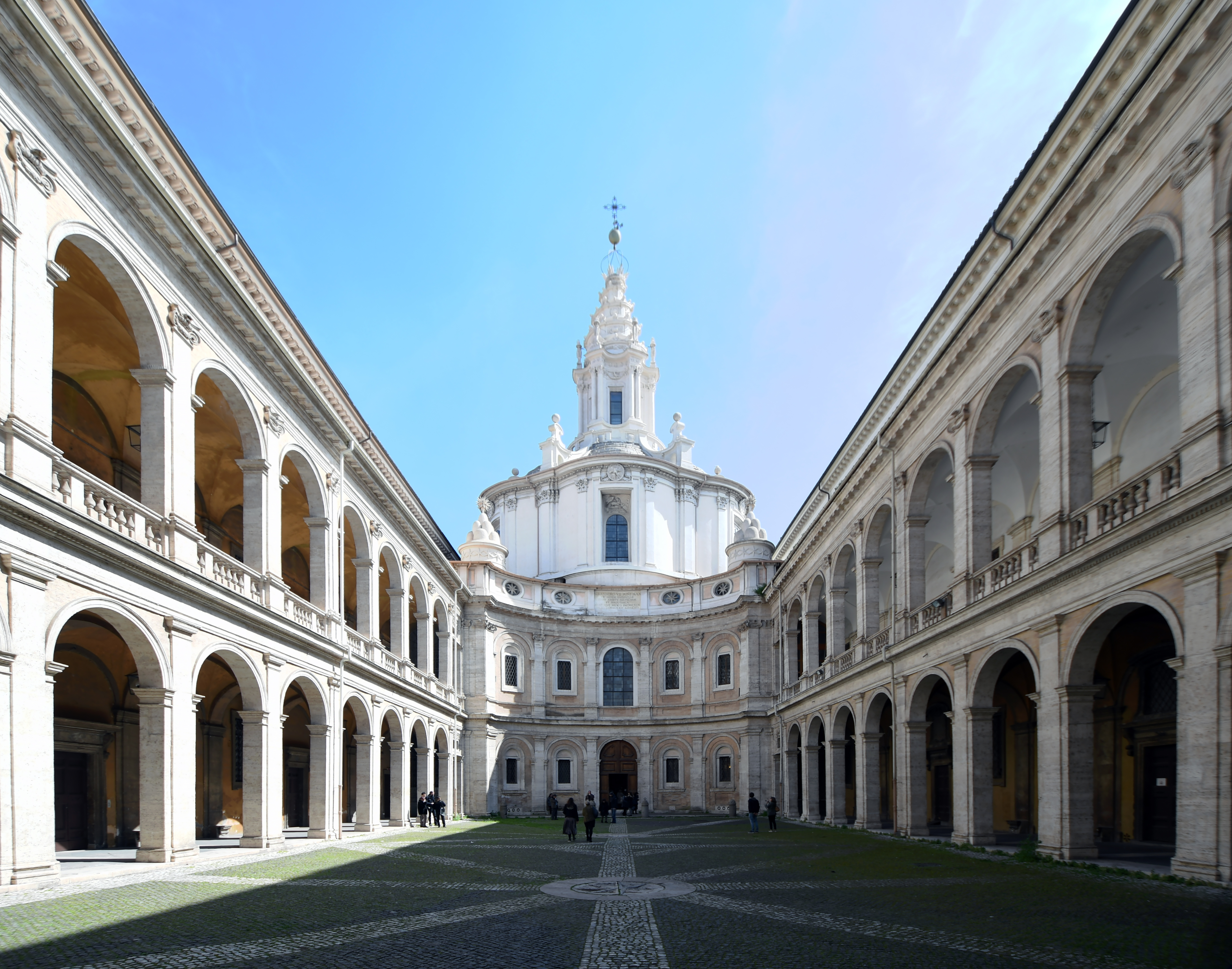
Sapienza University of Rome. Founded in 1303, it is one of the world's oldest universities, and with 122,000 students the largest university in Europe.

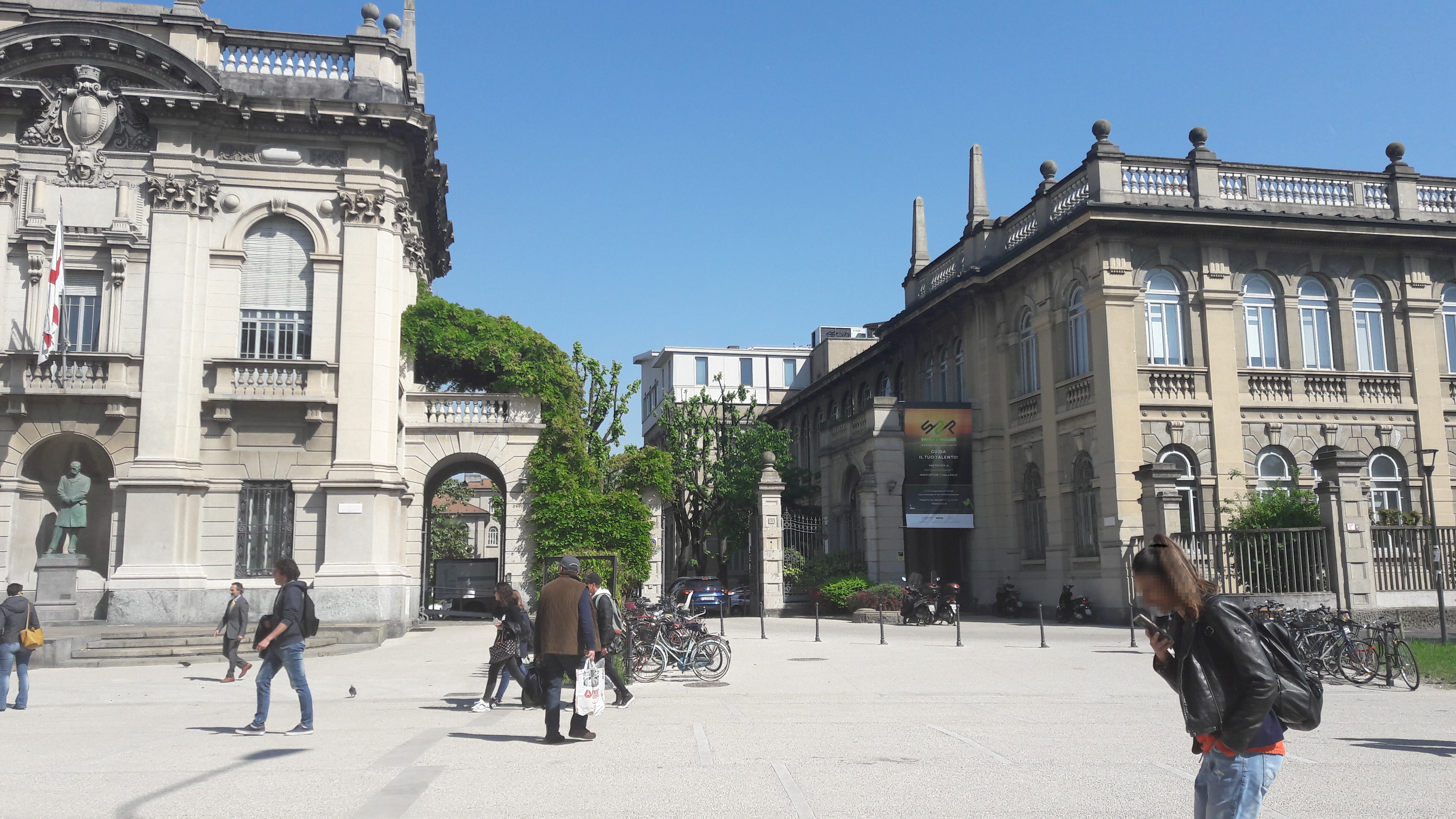
The Polytechnic University of Milan is the city's oldest university, founded in 1863. It is the largest technical university in Italy.

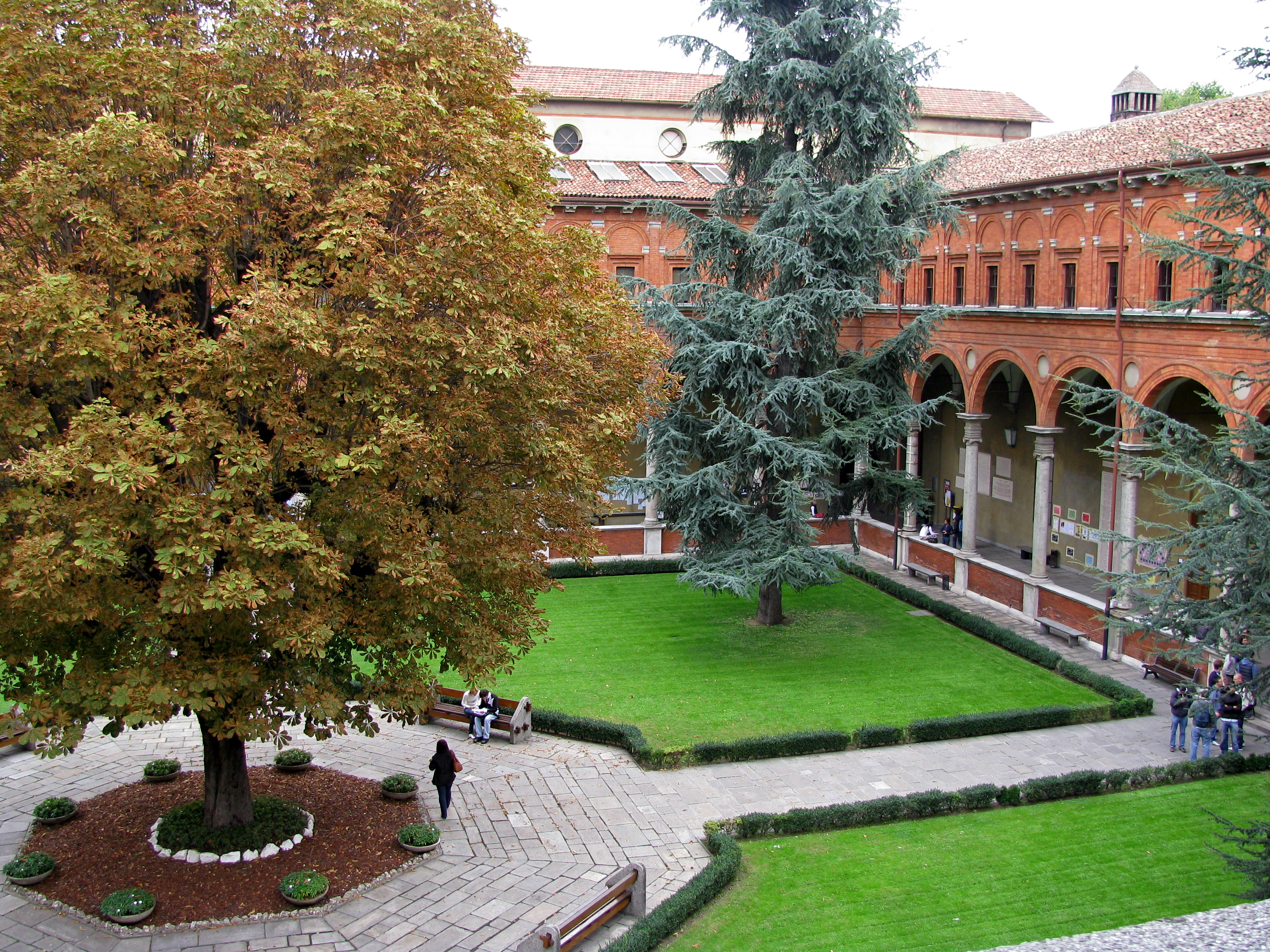
Università Cattolica del Sacro Cuore, an Italian private research university founded in 1921. Its main campus is located in Milan, Italy, with satellite campuses in Brescia, Piacenza, Cremona and Rome. Degrees are offered both in Italian and in English.

Italian universities are among the oldest universities in the world, with the University of Bologna (founded in 1088) the the oldest extant university and the University of Naples Federico II the world's oldest state-funded university in continuous operation. Most universities in Italy are state-supported.

There are also a number of "superior graduate schools" (grandes écoles) or scuola superiore universitaria, which offer titles including the diploma di perfezionamento, equivalent to a doctorate, dottorato di ricerca, i.e., research doctorate or doctor of philosophy.

There are three superior graduate schools with "university status" and three institutes with the status of doctoral colleges, which function at the graduate and post-graduate levels, respectively. Nine additional schools are direct offshoots of the universities, i.e., do not have their own 'university status'. One is the Scuola Normale Superiore di Pisa (founded in 1810 by Napoleon as a branch of École Normale Supérieure), borrowing its model of organization from the École Normale Supérieure. These institutions are commonly referred to as "schools of excellence" ("scuole di eccellenza").

=== Japan ===
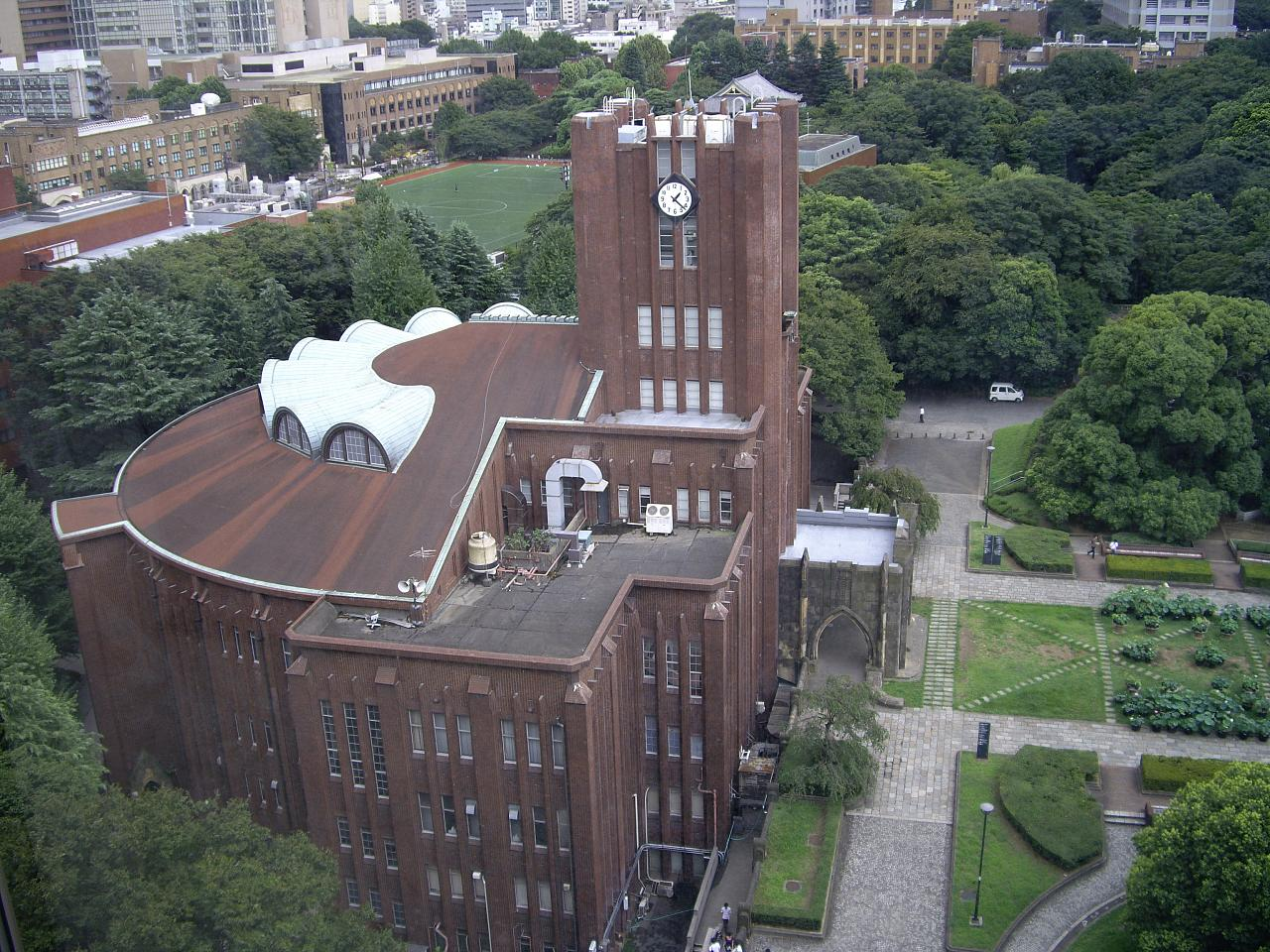
University of Tokyo, a research university in Tokyo

=== Kazakhstan ===
Higher education in Kazakhstan is governed by the Law on Education of the Republic of Kazakhstan, model rules for higher-education institutions, and individual university charters. It encompasses universities and other higher-education institutions, with governance structures defined by law and institutional statutes.

The Ministry of Science and Higher Education supervises accreditation, licensing, and quality assurance for tertiary institutions. Rectors and academic councils manage day-to-day operations within universities and colleges, while individual charters provide additional rules for governance, curricula, and institutional procedures. Students have the right to access state-guaranteed higher education, subject to admission requirements and state regulations.

=== United States ===
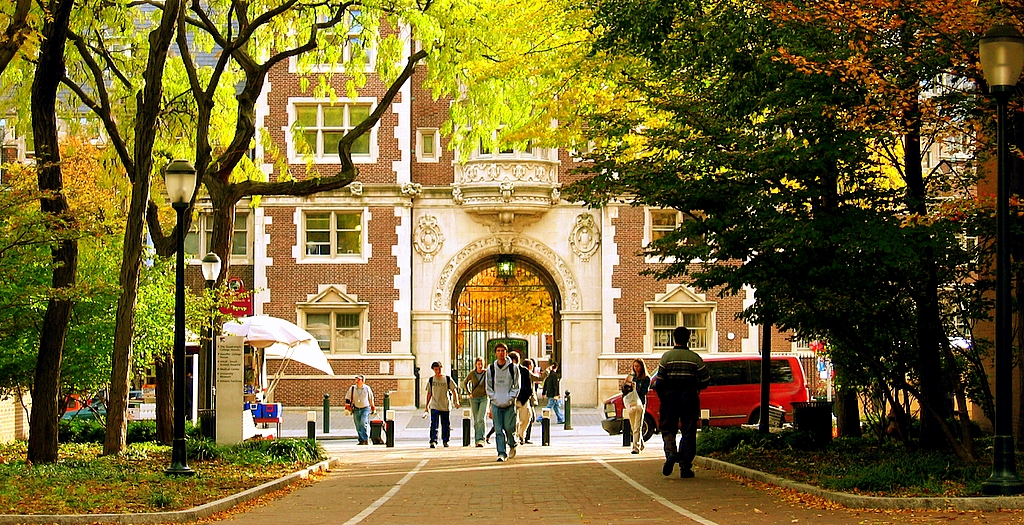
The University of Pennsylvania, an American research university

The higher education system in the United States is decentralized and regulated independently by each state with accreditors playing a key role in ensuring institutions meet minimum standards. It is large and diverse with institutions that are privately governed and institutions that are owned and operated by state and local governments. Some private institutions are affiliated with religious organizations whereas others are secular with enrollment ranging from a few dozen to tens of thousands of students. The United States Department of Education presents a broad-spectrum view of tertiary education and detailed information on the nation's educational structure, accreditation procedures, and connections to state as well as federal agencies and entities.

The Carnegie Classification of Institutions of Higher Education provides one framework for classifying U.S. colleges and universities in several different ways. US tertiary education also includes various non-profit organizations promoting professional development of individuals in the field of higher education and helping expand awareness of related issues like international student services and complete campus internationalization.

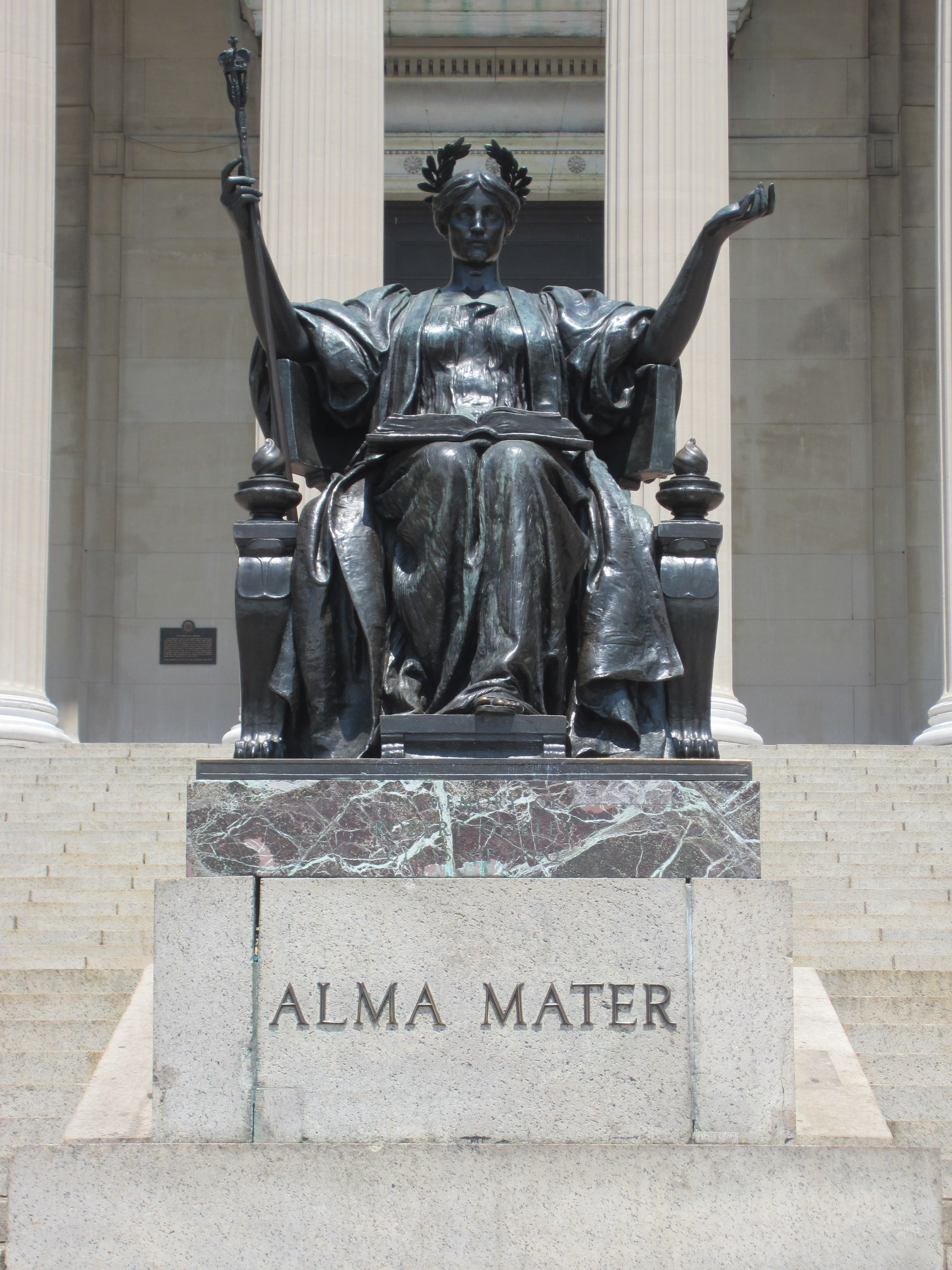
Alma Mater by Daniel Chester French, Columbia University. The alma mater, meaning "nourishing mother" in Latin, is one of the most enduring symbols of the university. The phrase was first used to describe the University of Bologna, Italy, founded in 1088.

=== Nigeria ===
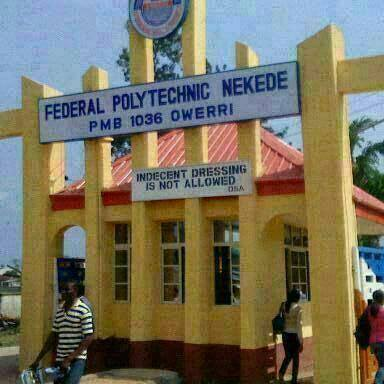
Federal Polytechnic, Nekede in Owerri, Nigeria

In Nigeria, access to higher education is via the Unified Tertiary Matriculation Examination (UTME), combined with O-level credits and post-UTME screening examinations.

== See also ==
- List of education articles by country
- List of higher education associations and alliances
- List of universities and colleges by country
- College and university rankings
- Governance in higher education
- Graduation
- Higher education accreditation
- Higher education bubble
- Higher education policy

== Notes ==
Preceded by Grade 12/Grade 13	Higher education age varies (usually 18–22)	Succeeded by Postgraduate education
