= EERIV Europe =

Lithuanian education consultancy company

- Type: Private limited company
- Industry: Education consultancy
- Founded: December 9, 2016; 9 years ago
- Founder: Esong Flaubert
- Website: www.eeriveurope.com

EERIV Europe is a Lithuanian education consultancy company headquartered in Vilnius. The company provides services relating to international student recruitment, university applications and study opportunities in European countries. Lithuanian business records classify the company among businesses engaged in information technology consultancy activities.

== History ==
The company was incorporated in Lithuania on 9 December 2016 under the name UAB Judikta. It subsequently adopted the name EERIV Europe. In 2025, the company organised an educational seminar in Cameroon for prospective students seeking information about studying in Europe. it also operate in other part of African countries

== Activities ==
EERIV Europe works with prospective international students seeking admission to educational institutions in Europe. Its services include information and support relating to university applications and student mobility, in 2025 This Day named the company among top 20 study partners in Europe. The company operates a digital platform known as EERIV Edu, which was introduced as a tool intended to assist prospective students with aspects of the university application process. In 2024, EERIV Europe received the student mobility award at the Nigerian Tech and Innovator Awards The company received accreditation from the International Consultants for Education and Fairs (ICEF).

== Corporate information ==
EERIV Europe is registered in Lithuania as an uždaroji akcinė bendrovė (UAB), a form of private limited liability company. Corporate information published by Lithuanian business directories lists the company as active and reports a registered share capital of €28,200.

== See also ==
- Education in Lithuania
- International student
- Academic mobility
- Educational technology
