= Bologna declaration =

1999 declaration

The Joint Declaration of the European Ministers of Education convened in Bologna on 19 June 1999 is the main guiding document of the Bologna Process. It was adopted by ministers of education of 29 European countries at their meeting in Bologna in 1999.

It proposed a European Higher Education Area in which students and graduates could move freely between countries, using prior qualifications in one country as acceptable entry requirements for further study in another.

The principal aims agreed were:

1. "Adoption of a system of easily readable and comparable degrees". That is to say, countries should adopt common terminology and standards
2. "Adoption of a system essentially based on two main cycles, undergraduate and graduate. Access to the second cycle [graduate education] shall require successful completion of first cycle lasting a minimum of three years. The degree awarded after the first cycle shall also be relevant to the European labour market as an appropriate level of qualification. The second cycle should lead to the master and/or doctorate degree as in many European countries."

The 'Bergen meeting' subsequently refined the second point, and produced a three-cycle framework of qualifications, which in the UK terminology (adopted, at least partially, by many European countries) would be Bachelor for a first degree of three years, Master for subsequent study, and Doctor for a degree which has "made a contribution through original research that extends the frontier of knowledge by developing a substantial body of work".

The Bologna declaration has later been followed up a series of meetings between EU ministers. Each meeting has produced a communiqué based on their deliberations. To date these include;

- Prague 2001
- Berlin 2003
- Bergen 2005
- London 2007
- Leuven & Louvain-la-Neuve 2009
- Tirana 2024

The European Commission has published ( European Communities, Feb. 2009) an "ECTS Users' Guide", including one "Overview of national regulations (...)" and "Status of the proclamation".

The Bologna Ministerial Anniversary Conference was held in Budapest and Vienna in March 2010. It issued the Budapest-Vienna Declaration.

The communiqués indicate that progress is being made towards the Bologna Declaration's aim of a European Higher Education Area, however such an area is not universally accepted as being a desirable outcome.

According to the Budapest-Vienna declaration, the next Ministerial Meeting was held in Bucharest on 26–27 April 2012.

== The Bologna Process and Other Regions ==
=== Latin America ===
The Tuning Project in Latin America emerged from growing cooperation between European and Latin American universities, inspired by the Bologna Process. Launched in 2004, it sought to enhance the compatibility of higher education programs between both regions by promoting academic cooperation, curricular convergence and a competence-based approach to learning, while respecting regional diversity and institutional autonomy.
