= University training credit =

University training credit (credito formativo universitario (Italian), or CFU) is a method used in Italian universities to measure the workload required of the student to obtain a degree. It's a course credit system of Italy.

They constitute a simplification regarding the recognition of exams taken in other Italian or European universities (for example within the Erasmus programme) and are transferable through the European Credit Transfer and Accumulation System (ECTS).

== History ==
With the Berlinguer reform, issued in the wake of the innovations introduced first by the Bassanini reform and then by the Bologna process, they were introduced pursuant to the MUR decree Decree 3 November 1999, n. 509 University Education Credits (CFU) to facilitate movement within the system, which can also be acquired through work or professional activities. The acquisition methods were then modified by some ministerial decrees issued on 16 March 2007 during the Prodi II government.

Law 30 December 2010, n. 240, as part of the Gelmini reform, then placed a maximum limit on the recognition of credits deriving from non-academic experiences. For exchange students, the host university must choose whether to award the lowest, average or highest possible equivalent grade.

== General description ==
Each university exam is associated with a certain number of credits; a single CFU is equal to 25 hours of student effort. Each academic year consists of 60 training credits. To obtain a three-year degree (laurea triennale), 180 ECTS are required; for the master's degree (laurea magistrale) 120 (while the previously called "specialist degree" consisted of 300 training credits including those recognized at entry and those recovered relating to any training debts). Single-cycle master's degrees such as Medicine and Surgery or Law require 360 and 300 respectively.

Of the 25 hours, a variable portion (in relation to the class tables of the degree courses and what is decided by the competent collegial bodies for the individual study courses), but never less than 50% (except in particular cases represented by activities with a high experimental or practical: for example internships and workshops), is reserved for individual study. The remaining amount is represented by lectures, classroom exercises, seminars, i.e. what is physically provided by the university (some universities also include in the credit pool a conventionally fixed time dedicated to intermediate and/or final evaluation tests).

Training credits can be acquired not only by taking exams, but also with professional and/or work experience; each university department can determine the recognition of credits obtained through work, internships or otherwise. In any case, no more than 12 credits can be obtained deriving from these activities.

== Specific types ==
=== Medical specialties ===
As regards doctors in specialist training, the commitment for CFU is weighted according to two types of activities:

- professionalizing activities (practical and internship ones);
- other types of activities.

For professionalizing activities, 1 CFU is equivalent to 30 hours of commitment instead of 25 hours. This allows the trainee's weekly hourly commitment to be equal to that expected of full-time doctors at the National Health Service (38 hours per week).

In fact, the rule requires that at least 70% of the activities be of a professionalizing nature. From this it follows that the 60 annual CFU are divided by a minimum of 42 professional CFU (60*0.7=42) (equal to 1260 annual hours of commitment: 42 CFU * 30 hours/CFU = 1260 hours) and 18 "ordinary" CFU (equal to 450 annual hours of commitment: 18 CFU * 25 hours/CFU = 450 hours), for a total of 1710 annual hours, up to a maximum of 60 professionalizing CFU (equal to 1800 annual hours of commitment: 60 CFU * 30 hours/CFU = 1800 hours).

Considering that the trainee is entitled to up to 30 days of annual leave, the annual working days (on 5-day working weeks) are approximately 230 per year (365*5/7-30=230.71), equal to approximately 46 weeks of 5 working days (230/5=46).

It therefore follows that the theoretical weekly time commitment of the trainee would be approximately between 37 and 39 hours per week (1710/46=37.2; 1800/46=39.1). That is, between approximately 1.25-1.5 CFU depending on the type of activity (professionalizing/non-professional).

=== AFAM institutes ===
The AFAM institutions possess training credits similar to CFUs called CFA (academic training credits), regulated by the Presidential Decree of 8 July 2005, n. 212.

1. The academic training credit, hereinafter referred to as credit, corresponds to 25 hours of commitment per student; by ministerial decree, variations in increases or decreases in the aforementioned hours can be determined for individual schools, within the limit of 20 percent.

2. The average amount of learning effort carried out in a year by a full-time student is conventionally set at 60 credits.

3. The ministerial decrees also determine, for each school, the fraction of the overall time commitment that must be reserved for personal study, laboratory activities or other individual training activities. The same decrees normally assign 30 percent of the overall commitment of each credit to theoretical lessons, 50 percent to theoretical-practical activities and 100 percent to laboratory activities.

4. The credits corresponding to each training activity are acquired by the student by passing the exam or other form of profit verification provided for by the teaching regulations, without prejudice to the fact that the evaluation of profit is carried out in the manner referred to in article 10, paragraph 4, letter d).

5. The total or partial recognition of credits acquired by a student, for the purpose of continuing studies in another course of the same institution or in other institutions of higher artistic and musical education or universities or of higher technical education referred to in article 69 of law 17 May 1999, n. 144, is the responsibility of the institution that welcomes the student, with predetermined procedures and criteria established in the respective teaching regulations.

6. Forms of periodic verification of the credits acquired may be foreseen in the teaching regulations, in order to evaluate the relevance of the related cognitive contents and the minimum number of credits to be acquired by the student in specific times, diversified for full-time students in studies or at the same time engaged in work activities.

7. The institutions can recognize as credits, according to criteria predetermined in the teaching regulations, the professional knowledge and skills acquired in the specific discipline.

8. In the first application of this regulation, by decree of the Minister, after consulting the CNAM, the correspondences between the credits acquired in the previous system and the credits foreseen in the new courses are identified.

(Presidential Decree 8 July 2005, n. 212)

== See also ==
- European Credit Transfer and Accumulation System (ECTS)
- Course credit
- Bachelor of Medicine, Bachelor of Surgery (MBBS)
- Academic grading in Italy
- Latin honors
- Honours degree
