= Academic grading in Italy =

There are two grading systems used in Italy:

To someone familiar with both the Italian and the U.S. college systems, Italian grades are best translated into American grades (and vice versa) according to the following table:

== Scuola primaria, scuola secondaria di primo e secondo grado ==
In Italian primary and secondary school a 10-point scale is used, 6 being the minimum grade for passing.

There has been a push in recent years to uniform the system to the 0–10 scale. A grade below 6 is considered insufficient, while a grade below 4 is considered to be extremely insufficient.

In high school, if a student, at the end of the year, reports an insufficient grade average in a certain subject (5 or below), they have to take a reparatory exam before the next school year begins; if the result of the reparatory exam is again not sufficient, the student cannot pass to the next year and will have to repeat it. A student who, at the end of the year, has more than 3 insufficient subjects will not pass to the subsequent class and will have to repeat the year.

ECTS grading Scale
ECTS Grade	% of successful students	Corresponding Italian grades
A-A+	95%-100%	9,5-10
A-	90%-95%	9-9,5
B+	80%-90%	8-9
C	60%-80%	6-8
E	50%-60%	5-6
F-Fx	0%-50%	1-5

== University ==
For ordinary exams, universities in Italy use a 30-point scale that can be divided into failing (0 to 17) and passing (18 to 30 cum laude) grades. For final assessment of the entire degree, a 110-point scale is used, which is divided into two as well, with 66 being the minimum for a degree to be awarded. The 110-point scale incorporates scores both on course exams and for the final thesis. For outstanding results, lode, "praise" or "cum laude," is added to the maximum grade. 30L means 30 cum laude in Latin, 30 con lode in Italian, and 30 with honors in English. Some Universities in Italy used a 100-point scale instead of 110.

The table is purely indicative: there are significant differences between different universities and above all between bachelor's and master's degrees. The grades received by master's degree students are statistically higher than those received by bachelor's degrees.

Italian grades with corresponding ECTS and United States grading
Italian grades	ECTS Grade	ECTS Definition	% of successful students	U.S. Grade	U.S. Definition
26–30, 30 con Lode	A	Excellent	5%	30, 30 con Lode: A+; 28–29: A; 26–27: A−	Excellent
21–25	B	Very Good	10%	24–25: B+; 22–23: B; 21: B-	Good
19–21	C	Good	20%	21: C+; 20: C; 19: C-	Satisfactory
18	D	Satisfactory	40%	D	Passing
14–17	Fx	Fail		E or F	Fail
0–13	F	Fail		E or F	Fail

== Italian grade conversion tables for Erasmus ==
=== Belgium ===
Conversion table for Erasmus grades
Italy	Belgium
30 cum laude	over 16
30	15–16
29	14
28	13
27	12
26	11,5
25	11,5
24	11
23	11
22	10,5
21	10,5
20	10,5
19	10,5
18	10

=== Denmark ===
Conversion table for Erasmus grades
Italy	Denmark
30 cum laude	12
30	12
29	11,9–10
28	11,9–10
27	11,9–10
26	9,9–7
25	9,9–7
24	9,9–7
23	6,9–4
22	6,9–4
21	6,9–4
20	3,9–2
19	3,9–2
18	3,9–2

=== Finland ===
Conversion table for Erasmus grades
Italy	Finland
30 cum laude	90–100 or 5
30	90–100 or 5
29	80–89 or 4
28	80–89 or 4
27	80–89 or 4
26	70–79 or 3
25	70–79 or 3
24	70–79 or 3
23	60–69 or 2
22	60–69 or 2
21	60–69 or 2
20	50–59 or 1
19	50–59 or 1
18	50–59 or 1

=== France ===
Conversion table for Erasmus grades
Italy	France
30 cum laude	over 16
30	15–16
29	14
28	13
27	12
26	11,5
25	11,5
24	11
23	11
22	10,5
21	10,5
20	10,5
19	10,5
18	10

=== Germany ===
Conversion table for Erasmus grades
Italy	Germany
30 cum laude	< 1.0
30	1.0
29	1.3
28	1.5
27	1.7
26	2.0
25	2.3
24	2.5
23	2.7
22	3.0
21	3.3
20	3.5
19	3.7
18	4.0

=== Hungary ===
Conversion table for Erasmus grades
Italy	Hungary
30	5
29	5
28	5
27	5
26	4
25	4
24	4
23	4
22	3
21	3
20	3
19	2
18	2
18>	1

=== Ireland ===
Conversion table for Erasmus grades
Italy	Ireland
30 cum laude	A
30	A
29	B+
28	B
27	B-
26	C+
25	C
24	C-
23	D+
22	D
21	D
20	D-
19	D-
18	D-

=== Romania ===
Conversion table for Erasmus grades
Italy	Romania
30 cum laude	10
30	9
29	9
28	8
27	8
26	7
25	7
24	6
23	6
22	6
21	5
20	5
19	5
18	5

=== The Netherlands ===
Conversion table for Erasmus grades
Italy	The Netherlands
30 cum laude	10+
30	9.3–10
29	9.3–10
28	9.3–10
27	8.3–9
26	8.3–9
25	8.3–9
24	6–8
23	6–8
22	6–8
21	6–8
20	6–8
19	6–8
18	6–8

=== Portugal ===
Conversion table for Erasmus grades
Italy	Portugal
30 cum laude	19–20
30	17–18
29	14–16
28	14–16
27	14–16
26	12–13
25	12–13
24	12–13
23	10–11
22	10–11
21	10–11
20	10–11
19	10–11
18	10–11

=== Spain ===
Conversion table for Erasmus grades
Italy	Spain	
30 cum laude	Matricula de honor	10
30	Sobre saliente	9
29	Sobre saliente	9
28	Notable	8–7
27	Notable	8–7
26	Notable	8–7
25	Notable	8–7
24	Notable	8–7
23	Aprobado	6–5
22	Aprobado	6–5
21	Aprobado	6–5
20	Aprobado	6–5
19	Aprobado	6–5
18	Aprobado	6–5

=== United Kingdom ===
Conversion table for Erasmus grades
Italy	United Kingdom
30 cum laude	A
30	A
29	B1
28	B2
27	B3
26	C1
25	C2
24	C3
23	D1
22	D2
21	D2
20	D3
19	D3
18	D3

== See also ==
- University training credit (CFU)
- Latin honors
- Honours degree
