= Bologna Process =

System for compatibility of higher education qualifications in the European region

- Members (dark green) and suspended members (light green)
- Named after: University of Bologna
- Successor: European Higher Education Area
- Formation: 25 May 1998; 28 years ago (Sorbonne declaration); 19 June 1999; 27 years ago (Bologna declaration)
- Type: Treaties of the European Union
- Members: 49 states
- Website: www.ehea.info

The Bologna Process is a series of ministerial meetings and agreements between European countries to ensure comparability in the standards and quality of higher-education qualifications. The process has created the European Higher Education Area under the Lisbon Recognition Convention. It is named after the University of Bologna, where the Bologna declaration was signed by education ministers from 29 European countries in 1999. The process was opened to other countries in the European Cultural Convention of the Council of Europe, and government meetings have been held in Prague (2001), Berlin (2003), Bergen (2005), London (2007), Leuven (2009), Budapest-Vienna (2010), Bucharest (2012), Yerevan (2015), Paris (2018), and Rome (2020).

Before the signing of the Bologna declaration, the Magna Charta Universitatum was issued at a meeting of university rectors celebrating the 900th anniversary of the University of Bologna (and European universities) in 1988. One year before the declaration, education ministers Claude Allègre (France), Jürgen Rüttgers (Germany), Luigi Berlinguer (Italy) and Baroness Blackstone (UK) signed the Sorbonne declaration in Paris in 1998, committing themselves to "harmonising the architecture of the European Higher Education system". The Bologna Process has 49 participating countries.

== Signatories ==
Signatories of the Bologna Accord, members of the European Higher Education Area, are:

- 1999: Austria, Belgium (Flemish Community and French Community of Belgium separately), Bulgaria, the Czech Republic, Denmark, Estonia, Finland, France, Germany, Greece, Hungary, Iceland, Ireland, Italy, Latvia, Lithuania, Luxembourg, Malta, Netherlands, Norway, Poland, Portugal, Romania, Slovakia, Slovenia, Spain, Sweden, Switzerland, United Kingdom.
- 2001: Croatia, Cyprus, Liechtenstein, Turkey, European Commission
- 2003: Albania, Andorra, Bosnia and Herzegovina, North Macedonia, Russia, Serbia, Vatican City
- 2005: Armenia, Azerbaijan, Georgia, Moldova and Ukraine
- May 2007: Montenegro
- 2010: Kazakhstan
- May 2015: Belarus

All member states of the EU are participating in the process, with the European Commission also a signatory. Monaco and San Marino are the only members of the Council of Europe which did not adopt the process.

The ESU, EUA, EURASHE, EI, ENQA, UNICE, the Council of Europe and UNESCO are part of the process' follow-up. Other groups at this level are ENIC, NARIC and EURODOC.

== Rejected countries ==
Four countries – Israel, Kyrgyzstan, Kosovo and the unrecognized Northern Cyprus – have applied to join but did not meet the membership criteria.

Israel is not a party to the European Cultural Convention of the Council of Europe, although it has observer status. Although Israel is not geographically part of Europe, it is part of the UNESCO European Region (although not a UNESCO member). Israel has also ratified the Lisbon Recognition Convention but, under the criteria of the 2003 Berlin Communiqué, it is ineligible for the Bologna Process.

Kosovo is not a party to the European Cultural Convention of the Council of Europe. Although Serbia is a party, Kosovo declared independence from it and has theoretically been a part of the Bologna Process since the Kosovo War. It was suggested that Kosovo could be associated with the process in a category appropriate to its situation, such as guest or special-observer status.

Kyrgyzstan is not a party to the European Cultural Convention of the Council of Europe, although has also ratified the Lisbon Recognition Convention.

Northern Cyprus is not a party to the European Cultural Convention of the Council of Europe and not recognized as an independent political entity by any member of the Bologna Process except Turkey.

== Qualifications framework ==
The basic framework is three cycles of higher-education qualifications. The framework adopted by the ministers at their meeting in Bergen in 2005 defines the qualifications in terms of learning outcomes, which are statements of what students know and can do on completing their degrees. In describing the cycles, the framework uses the European Credit Transfer and Accumulation System (ECTS):

- First cycle: typically 180–240 ECTS credits (a minimum of 60 credits per academic year), usually awarding a bachelor's degree. The European Higher Education Area did not introduce a bachelor-with-honours programme, which allows graduates to receive a "BA hons." degree (used, for example, in the UK, Australia, New Zealand, and Canada) and sometimes enables graduates to begin doctoral studies without first obtaining a master's degree.
- Second cycle: typically 60–120 ECTS credits (a minimum of 60 credits per academic year), usually awarding a master's degree.
- Third cycle (doctoral degree): There is no concrete ECTS range, since the disciplines vary in length and comprehensiveness. However, some countries have minimum credit weight requirements on doctoral degrees. Those country-level requirements typically require 120–420 ECTS of study.

In most cases, it would take three to four years to earn a bachelor's degree and another one or two years for a master's degree. Doctoral degrees usually require another two to four years of specialization, primarily individual research under a mentor. Degree names may vary by country. One academic year normally corresponds to 60 ECTS credits, equivalent to 1,500–1,800 hours of study.

== Effects by state ==
The process, an intergovernmental agreement between EU and non-EU countries, does not have the status of EU legislation. Since the Bologna Declaration is not a treaty or convention, there are no legal obligations for the signatory states; participation and cooperation are voluntary.

Although the declaration was created without a formal affiliation with EU institutions, the European Commission (which has supported European projects such as the Tuning and TEEP projects) plays an important role in implementing the process. Most countries do not fit the framework, using their traditional systems. The process, which will result in bilateral agreements between countries and institutions which recognise each other's degrees, is moving from strict convergence in time spent on qualifications towards a competency-based system which will have an undergraduate and postgraduate division (with a bachelor's degree in the former and a master's and doctorate in the latter).

In mainland Europe, five-year-plus first degrees are common. Many do not complete their studies, and many countries are introducing bachelor-level qualifications. The situation is evolving as the Bologna Process is implemented.

Some countries introduced the European Credit Transfer and Accumulation System (ECTS) and discussed their degree structures, qualifications, financing and management of higher education and mobility programmes. At the institutional level, the reform involved higher-education institutions, their faculties or departments, student and staff representatives and other factors. Priorities varied by country and institution.

=== Andorra ===
In Andorra, degrees are awarded by the state in all three cycles (bachelor's, master's and doctoral). The University of Andorra has adapted its classroom studies to the European Higher Education Area in accordance with the Bologna Agreement. The degree workload is counted in European credits, with a European equivalent of 180 credits (three years) for bachelor's degrees and 120 credits (two years) for master's degrees.

=== Austria ===
Austria's situation is similar to Germany's, with the lowest undergraduate degrees the Magister (FH) and Diplom (FH) (designed to take three or four years). The lowest graduate degrees are Magister and Diplom, which typically fulfill a thesis requirement (including final examination and thesis defence) and can be obtained after four to six years of study. In 2000 many curricula began to be converted into bachelor's degrees (Bakkalaureat; the term was replaced by "bachelor's" in most curricula by 2007) and master's (Magisterstudium) programmes, with nominal durations of six semesters (three years) and three to four semesters (18 months to two years) respectively.

Enrollment in a doctoral programme generally requires a master's degree in a related field. Although the nominal duration of doctoral programmes is two or three years, the time to graduate varies considerably and is generally longer.

=== Armenia ===
Armenia ratified the Bologna Process in 2005 and is a member of the European Higher Education Area.

=== Azerbaijan ===
Azerbaijan is a full member of the Bologna Process since 2005.

=== Belarus ===
Belarus became a member of the European Higher Education Area at a conference in Yerevan, Armenia, in May 2015.

After its participation in Russian Invasion of Ukraine, BFUG members decided to suspend the rights Belarus representation in the EHEA on 11 April 2022.

=== Bulgaria ===
Bulgaria joined the Bologna Process in 2001, committing to reforms in higher education in line with European standards. In 2004, the Law on Higher Education introduced the European Credit Transfer and Accumulation System (ECTS), which ensures the comparability of study programs and facilitates diploma recognition and academic mobility. One credit corresponds to 25–30 hours of student work, and one academic year equals 60 credits. The reform established a three-cycle system of study—bachelor's, master's, and doctoral degrees—along with a diploma supplement and a national qualifications framework. These changes integrated Bulgarian universities into the European Higher Education Area, enhancing the quality and competitiveness of higher education in the country. https://eurydice.eacea.ec.europa.eu/bg/eurypedia/bulgaria/bulgaria-bgvisshe-obrazovanie

=== Croatia ===
In Croatia, implementation of the Bologna Process began during the 2005–2006 academic year. Diploma degree became baccalaureate (bachelor's degree, Croatian: prvostupnik), and the programmes were shortened from four to about three years. Magisterij (master's degree) is achieved after two additional years of post-graduate study. The doktorat degree (doctorate) may be received after three more years (eight years total).

The typical length of study is three years for a bachelor's degree (baccalaureus), two years for a master's degree (magistar) and three years for a doctor of science (doktor znanosti). A local distinction is made between vocational and academic degrees at the baccalaureate level, and between engineering and other programs at levels below the doctoral.

There are several exceptions. The first degree in economics still takes four years, and the master's degree is obtained after an additional year at the University of Zagreb's Faculty of Economics and Zagreb School of Economics and Management. The four-plus-one-year system also applies to fine arts and music. Medical and related studies replace the bachelor's degree with six-year first professional degrees and graduate Doctor of Medicine (doktor medicine) degrees.

The old degrees are translated as follows:

- Diploma holders hold master's degrees (magistar inženjer for engineers and magistar for others).
- The old master's degree is grandfathered into magistar znanosti (Master of Science), an intermediate title between the new master's degree and a doctorate for local use.
- Doctoral degrees remain the same.

In May 2008, about 5,000 students protested weak funding, imprecisely defined new rules and the poor results of the Bologna reform.

=== Denmark ===
Denmark introduced the 3+2+3 system in 1971 with an education-management working group of the Society of Danish Engineers and a 1984–85 group of the Federation of Danish Industries, both headed by Hans Bruno Lund. Before the adoption of international standards, the lowest degree normally awarded at universities in Denmark was equivalent to a master's degree (Kandidat/cand.mag). Although bachelor's degrees have been obtained after three years of study, most students continue the additional two years required for a master's degree. Mid-length (two-to four-year) professional degrees have been adapted as professional bachelor's degrees (3 1/2 years).

=== Finland ===
In the Finnish pre-Bologna system, higher education was divided between universities and polytechnics. In universities, degrees were divided in most fields into a three-year bachelor's degree (kandidaatti) and a two-year master's degree (maisteri). In these fields, the Bologna Process resulted in no change.

In engineering, universities only offered a 5 1/2-year master's program (diplomi-insinööri). This has been replaced by a three-year bachelor's degree (tekniikan kandidaatti) and a two-year master's degree (diplomi-insinööri), for which the English names are Bachelor of Science (Technology) and Master of Science (Technology). A corresponding change has been made in military higher education, where the officer's degree was divided between bachelor's and master's programmes. Finnish Universities of Applied Sciences, which have offered bachelor's-equivalent engineering programmes, began offering master's-degree programs in 2005. Some Master of Engineering (insinööri (ylempi AMK)) programmes are taught in English.

Medicine and dentistry retain their non-standard degree structure, where the Licentiate (higher than a master's degree, but less extensive than Doctor of Medicine or Dentistry degrees) is the basic degree. A six-year program of 360 ECTS credits leads to the Licentiate of Medicine (lääketieteen lisensiaatti) degree and a five-and-a-half-year program of 330 ECTS credits in dentistry leads to the Licentiate of Dentistry (hammaslääketieteen lisensiaatti) degree. There is an intermediate title (but not an academic degree) of lääketieteen kandidaatti, and no master's degree.

Study programs in psychology also total 330 ECTS credits and take five and a half years to complete, although they lead to a master's degree instead of a licenciate degree. The master's degree in psychology is 150 ETCS credits or more instead of 120 credits of a standard master's degree. Although there is an intermediate title of Bachelor of Psychology, a master's degree is required to be legally qualified to practice as a psychologist in any field and so is the basic degree.

Polytechnic degrees are considered bachelor's degrees in international use. In domestic use, bachelors transferring from polytechnics to universities may be required to amass a maximum of 60 ECTS credits of additional studies before beginning master's-level studies. In conjunction with the Bologna Process, polytechnics have the right to award master's degrees.

=== France ===
In France the baccalauréat, awarded at the end of secondary education, allows students to enter university. Before the LMD reform amid the 2000s which implemented the Bologna Process, it was followed by a two-year Diplôme d'études universitaires générales (DEUG) and a third-year Licence (the equivalent of a UK bachelor's degree).

Students could then pursue a Maîtrise, a one-year taught degree with an introduction to research via a mémoire which could be followed by a one-year vocational degree (the Diplôme d'études supérieures spécialisées or DESS) or research degree (the Diplôme d'études approfondies, or DEA). The DEA, preparation for a doctorate, was equivalent to the M. Phil. Students could then pursue a doctorat (PhD), which took at least three years.

The DESS was created in 1975 for students who completed four-year degrees. Intended as a doctorate with a more practical approach than research, it included the production of a 120-page paper which was defended to a jury of three international specialists in the field. The mini-thesis was kept in the libraries of the university issuing the DESS, unlike a PhD dissertation (distributed by its author to every French university library).

Higher education in France is also provided by non-university institutions dedicated to specific subjects. The Diplôme d'ingénieur (engineering diploma) is awarded to students after five years of study in state-recognized Écoles d'ingénieurs, particularly the Grandes Écoles such as Mines, Centrale and ENAC.

Although the baccalauréat and doctorat are unchanged in the Bologna system (known in France as LMD reform), the DEUG and licence have been merged into a three-year Licence. The Maîtrise, DESS and DEA have been combined into a two-year master's degree, which can be work- (master professionnel) or research-oriented (master recherche). The Diplôme d'ingénieur degree is still separate from a university degree, but holders may legally claim a master's degree as well.

Strikes occurred in 2002 and 2003 and 2007 protesting LMD reform, focusing more on under-funding of French universities since May 1968 than on the Bologna Process. Although the two major student organisations object to some aspects of its application to the French system, they generally welcome the European process.

=== Georgia ===
Although Georgia joined the Bologna Process in 2005 at the Bergen summit, steps towards the establishment of the European Higher Education Area were completed earlier. Since the end of the 1990s, many Georgian universities (mostly private) have introduced limited educational programs allowing students to graduate with a bachelor's degree (four years) and earn a master's degree (one to two years) while preserving the old five-to-six-year scheme. During the Soviet era, the only degree was the discontinued Specialist.

Cycles of higher education are divided into first (bachelor's degree with 240 credits), second (master's degree, 120 credits) and third (doctorate, 180 credits). Human and veterinary medicine and dentistry (300–360 credits) are integrated programs with a qualification equal to a master's degree.

=== Greece ===
Greece joined the Bologna Process in 1999. Since 2007, more-intensive steps towards the establishment of the European Higher Education Area were completed.

=== Hungary ===
In Hungary, the Bologna system applies to those who began their university education in or after September 2006. One hundred and eight majors were available for selection (compared with over 400 in 2005), of which six are exempt from the bachelor's-master's division: law, human and veterinary medicine, dentistry, pharmacy and architecture.

According to an online poll by the National Tertiary Education Information Centre, 65 percent of respondents thought it unnecessary to adopt the system. The new system provides less of a guarantee that students will obtain a master's degree, because many will complete their education after the three-year bachelor's degree. Students are expected to study more unrelated subjects during the first three years, due to the smaller number of majors.

=== Iceland ===
In Iceland, bachelor's degrees are usually three years in duration; master's degrees are two years, and doctoral degrees range from three to six years.

=== Ireland ===
Ireland was one of the original signatories of the Bologna declaration in 1999. The Irish National Framework of Qualifications (NFQ), launched in 2003, is the main framework used to describe Irish qualifications in relation to the Bologna three-cycle structure and the European Qualifications Framework.

Under the NFQ, the Higher Certificate at Level 6 is a short-cycle higher education award; ordinary bachelor's degrees at Level 7 and honours bachelor's degrees and higher diplomas at Level 8 correspond to the first cycle; master's degrees and postgraduate diplomas at Level 9 correspond to the second cycle; and doctoral degrees and higher doctorates at Level 10 correspond to the third cycle.

Ireland completed verification of the compatibility of the NFQ with the Framework for Qualifications of the European Higher Education Area in 2006. In 2020, Quality and Qualifications Ireland completed an updated national referencing report re-referencing the NFQ to both the EQF and the QF-EHEA.

Ireland also has a National Framework for Doctoral Education, first published in 2015 and revised in 2023, which sets out national principles for doctoral education across Irish higher education institutions.

=== Italy ===
Italy fits the framework since its 1999 adoption of the 3+2 system. The first degree is the Laurea triennale, which may be obtained after three years of study. Selected students may then complete their studies with two additional years of specialization leading to the Laurea Magistrale.

The Laurea corresponds to a bachelor's degree; the Laurea Magistrale, corresponding to a master's degree, grants access to third-cycle programmes (post-MA degrees, doctorates or specialized schools) lasting two to five years (completing a PhD usually takes three years). A five-year degree, Laurea Magistrale a Ciclo Unico (Single-cycle Master's Degree) is awarded in law (Giurisprudenza), in Primary teacher education (Scienze della Formazione Primaria), in Architecture (Architettura), in Pharmacy (Farmacia) and Pharmaceutical Sciences (Chimica e Tecnologia Farmaceutiche), as well as in visual arts (Accademia di Belle Arti) and music (Conservatorio di Musica). A six-year degree, Laurea Magistrale a Ciclo Unico (Single-cycle Master's Degree) is awarded in medicine (Medicina) and dentistry (Odontoiatria). The title for BA and BS undergraduate students is Dottore and for MA, MFA, MSc, MD and MEd graduate students Dottore magistrale (abbreviated Dott., Dott.ssa or Dr.). This should not be confused with PhD and post-MA graduates, whose title is Dottore di Ricerca (Research Doctor).

The Italian system has two types of postgraduate degree (called "Master", not to be confused with the master's degree). Laurea Magistrale (120 ECTS) allows access to third-cycle programmes, and Master universitario (at least 60 ECTS) may be divided into first- (second cycle) and second-level master's degrees (third cycle). A first-level master's degree is accessible by a first-cycle degree and "does not allow access to PhD and to 3rd cycle programmes, since this type of course does not belong to the general requirements established at national level, but it is offered under the autonomous responsibility of each university".

=== Kazakhstan ===
Kazakhstan has been a full member of the Bologna Process and European Higher Education Area since 2010.

=== Netherlands ===
The Netherlands differentiates between HBO (university of applied sciences) and WO (scientific education or research universities). WO and HBO have adopted the bachelor's-master's system. It generally requires three (WO) or four (HBO) years of education to obtain a bachelor's degree; graduates may then apply for a master's program at a university, which generally require one to two years to complete. An HBO bachelor graduate may have to pass one year of pre-master's education to bridge the gap between their HBO study and (research-oriented) WO study to be admitted to a WO Master's programme, which may grant degrees such as MA, MSc and LLM. There are also HBO master's studies, and HBOs are the only institutions offering associate degrees. A masters degree is the default (legal) requirement to enter a PhD program in the Netherlands. Dispensation can be granted on an individual base, judged by a special committee. With an HBO master's degree, it is also possible to follow a professional doctorate at a university of applied sciences.

=== Portugal ===
Due to the Bologna Process, in 2005 new licenciatura (licentiate) degrees were organized at university and polytechnic institutions of Portugal. Previously a four- to six-year programme, equivalent to 300 ECTS, it is now a three-year first cycle and the only requirement for the two-year second cycle which awards a master's degree. Some Bologna courses are integrated five- or six-year programmes awarding a joint master's degree, a common practice in medicine. In engineering, despite the use of two cycles, an engineer may be licensed only after obtaining a master's degree. Master's degrees attained after five or six years of study correspond to the old undergraduate degrees known as licenciatura. The new licenciatura, obtained after three years of study, corresponds to the discontinued bacharelato awarded by polytechnics from the 1970s to the early 2000s (roughly equivalent to an extended associate degree). Old and new master's degrees are the first graduate degree before a doctorate, and the old and new licenciatura are undergraduate degrees.

The licenciatura degree (a four- to six-year course) was required for applicants who wished to undertake the old master's and doctoral programmes, but admission was reserved for those with a licenciatura degree with a grade above 14 (out of 20). After the changes introduced by the Bologna Process, the master's degree is conferred at the end of a programme roughly equivalent in time to many old licenciatura programmes. The process was developed to improve the education system to one based on the development of competency rather than the transmission of knowledge. Its goal was the development of a system of easily comparable degrees to simplify the comparison of qualifications across Europe. Its flexibility and transparency is intended to enable wider recognition of student qualifications, facilitating movement around a European Higher Education Area based on two main cycles (undergraduate and graduate) and providing third-cycle degrees for doctoral candidates.

=== Russia ===
The Russian higher education framework was basically incompatible with the process. The generic, lowest degree in all universities since the Soviet era is the Specialist, which can be obtained after five to six years of study. Since the mid-1990s, many universities have introduced limited programmes allowing students to graduate with a bachelor's degree in four years and a master's degree in an additional one to two years while preserving the old system.

After accession to the Bologna process happened in 2003, in October 2007, Russia moved to two-tier education in line with the Bologna Process. Universities inserted a BSc diploma in the middle of their standard specialist programmes, but the transition to MS qualification has not been completed.

Although Specialists and masters are eligible for doctoral programmes (Aspirantura), bachelors are not; the Specialist degree is being discontinued. In most universities bachelor's- and master's-degree education is free of charge, although some state and private universities charge for one or both. The labour market does not yet understand BSc diplomas, but some universities made the program similar to classical education and the MS stage remains mandatory for most graduates.

On April 11, 2022, against the backdrop of deteriorating relations between Russia and Western countries due to Russian invasion of Ukraine, the Bologna Group decided to suspend the representation of Russia and Belarus in the structures of the Bologna Process.

=== Sweden ===
A bill proposing new regulations in the field of Higher Education was presented to Parliament in 2005, and the new system came into force in July 2007. The new system of degrees will have two degrees, of different lengths, in each cycle.

Cycle	Swedish	English	Length (undergraduate)	Length (postgraduate)
1	Högskoleexamen	University diploma	2 years	n/a
1	Kandidatexamen	Bachelor's degree	3 years	n/a
2	Magisterexamen	Magister's degree, 1 year (a.k.a. "Swedish master's degree")	4 years	Kandidatexamen + 1 year
2	Masterexamen	Master's degree, 2 years	5 years	Kandidatexamen + 2 years or Magisterexamen + 1 year
3	Licentiatexamen	Licentiate	n/a	Magisterexamen or higher + 2 years
3	Doktorsexamen	Doctorate	n/a	Magisterexamen or higher + 4 years

Students may not always be offered all the combinations above to obtain a degree. The högskoleexamen is usually not offered, and many schools require students to obtain the kandidatexamen before obtaining a magisterexamen or masterexamen. Most third-cycle programmes require at least a magisterexamen, although the legal minimal requirement is either a degree from the second cycle or four years of finished courses, where at least one year is second cycle.

In July 2007 a new system of credits, compatible with the European Credit Transfer and Accumulation System, was introduced in which one credit (högskolepoäng) in the new system corresponds to one ECTS credit and two-thirds of a credit in the old system (poäng).

Some Swedish universities have introduced the ECTS standard grading scale for all students, and others will use it only for international students. Since criterion-referenced grading is used instead of relative grading in the Swedish educational system, the 10-, 25-, 30-, 25- and 10-percent distribution of students among A, B, C, D and E will not be done. Some universities only give Fail or Pass grades (F or P) for certain courses (such as internship and thesis projects) or assignments, such as laboratory exercises.

=== Turkey ===
Turkey has been a full member of the Bologna Process / European higher education area since 2001. The Turkish degree system has already been in line with the Bologna Process.

== Seminars ==
Several Bologna Process seminars have been held. The first devoted to a single academic discipline, Chemistry Studies in the European Higher Education Area (which approved Eurobachelor), was held in June 2004 in Dresden.

== See also ==
- Chemistry Quality Eurolabels
- European Credit Transfer and Accumulation System
- European Higher Education Area
- Melbourne Model
- University reform
- Education by country
  - Education in the Czech Republic
  - Education in Germany
  - Education in Kazakhstan
  - Education in Lithuania
  - Education in Latvia
  - Education in Malta
  - Education in Moldova
  - Education in Montenegro
  - Education in North Macedonia
  - Education in the Netherlands
  - Education in Norway
  - Education in Poland
  - Education in Romania
  - Education in Serbia
  - Education in Slovakia
  - Education in Slovenia
  - Education in Spain
  - Education in Sweden
  - Education in Switzerland
  - Education in Turkey
  - Education in Ukraine
  - Education in the United Kingdom

== Bibliography ==
- Alexandra Kertz-Welzel, "Motivation zur Weiterbildung: Master- und Bachelor-Abschlüsse in den USA", Diskussion Musikpädagogik, vol. 29, pp. 33–35, 2006.
