= Credential evaluation =

Credential evaluation is the way in which academic and professional degrees earned in one country are compared to those earned in another. Universities, colleges and employers around the world use credential evaluations to understand foreign education and to judge applicants for admission or employment.

Immigrants can use credential evaluations to gain recognition for study completed outside the country they are immigrating to and in doing so join the workforce as skilled immigrants. International students use credential evaluations to present their previous coursework and grades to universities anywhere for admission.

== Types of Credential Evaluations ==
Generally the types of credential evaluations vary depending on the country and purpose of the evaluation. The ENIC-NARIC offers full equivalency or comparable reports. In the United States and Canada credential evaluations range from detailed course-by-course analysis to document-by-document analysis depending on the admissions requirements of a particular school or the requirements for employment and immigration. While academic and professional institutions may use credential evaluations to assess candidates’ qualifications, the institution decides whether a candidates credentials meet their requirements for admission.

== Concerns ==
Credential evaluation can be difficult due to differences in academic standards, grade inflation, educational aims and objectives or academic integrity. Diploma mills and accreditation mills can result in fraudulent credentials.

== By region ==
=== United States ===
Universities and colleges in the United States saw a marked increase in the number of international students applying for admission after World War II when many European countries were recovering from the war. The need for an accurate and fair understanding of students’ educational past emerged and became even more important as the number of international students studying in the United States jumped from 25,000 in the years after the war, according to NAFSA. There were over 866,000 international students studying in the United States in 2013 to 2014. In 2019 the United States received more than 1,000,000 international students for the fourth consecutive year.

As universities face declining public financial support and the pressure to keep tuition affordable, academic institutions have relied on international students to offset the rising cost of higher education. The majority of international students in the United States are from China, India and South Korea. However, there has been a large and steady growth in the number of international students from Brazil, Vietnam, Indonesia and Nigeria.

There is no regulations in terms of international degree evaluation in the US, and the U.S. Department of State or the U.S. government of the entity doesn’t affiliate or endorse any foreign credential evaluation agencies. Therefore, there is no federal (national) government agency that oversees credential evaluations in the United States. There are professional associations such as Association of International Credential Evaluators, Inc. (AICE) and National Association of Credential Evaluation Services (NACES) that create and maintain ethical standards in the field though they are not governing agencies and membership by credential evaluators is voluntary. However, credential evaluators must meet certain criteria to belong to AICE and NACES. Universities and colleges also evaluate credentials themselves. An NACES or AICE agency is normally required by universities in the US.

=== Canada ===
Educational credential assessment (ECA) also known as credential evaluation can be used for immigration, education and licensing. An ECA is necessary for immigrants seeking entry into Canada under various Citizenship and Immigration Canada (CIC) programs, including the Federal Skilled Worker Program (FSWP) through Express Entry, which requires immigrants to have completed a minimum equivalent of a Canadian secondary school diploma. Since April 2013, the CIC has designated seven credential evaluation agencies to provide assessments for individuals immigrating to Canada. These designated agencies are members of the Alliance of Credential Evaluation Services of Canada.

Most Canadian licensing boards and professional regulatory bodies also require academic credential evaluations from internationally educated professionals. These evaluations determine whether foreign education is considered equivalent in value and recognition to a Canadian education, and they are conducted either internally or by members of the Alliance. In 2025, the Government of Canada announced $97 million in funding for Employment and Social Development Canada to establish the Foreign Credential Recognition Action Fund. This fund is intended to support collaboration with provinces and territories to improve foreign credential recognition, which could otherwise have been addressed through conditional federal transfers and access to immigration programs tied to compliance with fairer credential recognition practices aligned with federal priorities.

=== Europe ===
The Convention on the Recognition of the Qualifications Concerning Higher Education in the European Region, commonly called the Lisbon Recognition Convention, is the main legal agreement which governs the recognition of qualifications between the member states of the Council of Europe. The European Network of Information Centres and the National Academic Recognition Information Centres (known as ENIC-NARIC) can evaluate credentials and issue a “statement of comparability” for a university degree earned in one member country for use in another. The convention states that degree holders must have access to “adequate assessments” of their credentials and degrees must be recognized among member countries unless there are proven “substantial differences” between the degrees awarded in that country and the degree being assessed.

=== Australia ===
The Australian government evaluates foreign credentials depending on the reason for the evaluation. For example, if an evaluation is needed only for immigration purposes the Department of Immigration and Border Protection will assess qualifications. There are designated assessing authorities for specific professions, such as the Australian Institute For Teaching and School Leadership which assesses credentials for school teacher occupations. For most other credential assessments, Overseas Qualifications Units were established in most Australian states and territories to evaluate foreign credentials. The Department of Education and Training can also assess credentials for foreign-born residents of New South Wales and credentials for occupations that do not require registration, licensing, or professional membership.

=== Middle East ===
The Convention on the Recognition of Studies, Diplomas and Degrees in Higher Education in the Arab States was held in 1978 to “adopt terminology and evaluation criteria as similar as possible… in order to simplify the application of a system which will ensure the comparability of credits, subjects of study and diplomas” and to encourage student mobility across borders. Eighteen states signed the convention including Jordan, Morocco, Qatar, and Saudi Arabia.

== See also ==
- Validation of foreign studies and degrees
