= European Credit Transfer and Accumulation System =

Standard means for comparing academic credits across the European Union

The European Credit Transfer and Accumulation System (ECTS) is a standard means for comparing academic credits, i.e., the "volume of learning based on the defined learning outcomes and their associated workload" for higher education across the European Higher Education Area (EHEA). ECTS credits are awarded for successfully completed studies, with the basic definition being that one full time academic year corresponds to a total of 60 ECTS credits; typically this corresponds to an annual workload of 1,500 to 1,800 hours, although this can vary as defined by national regulations. It results in a corresponding equivalence of one ECTS credit for each 25 to 30 hours of work. However, it is the correspondence to the academic year, rather than the hours worked, that is defining.

ECTS credits originated within the European Union's Erasmus Programme in 1989 as a method of transferring credit earned during study abroad back to students' home institutions; since 2015 it has been part of the EHEA. ECTS originally included a standard ECTS grading scale, intended to be shown in addition to local (i.e., national) standard grades, but this was dropped in 2009 in favour of institutions instead providing a grade distribution table showing the statistical distribution of grades in their national or institutional system. ECTS credits describe the volume of learning, with the level of learning being defined by institutional systems that are referenced to national qualifications frameworks and international frameworks such as the EHEA's Framework for Qualifications of the European Higher Education Area and the EU's European Qualifications Framework for Lifelong Learning.

ECTS can be used by universities outside Europe, where it is increasingly adopted by institutions and can be successfully integrated with local credit systems based on comparable criteria.

== Current systems ==
List of credits given in one year in European countries
Country	Credit points per year	Hours per credit point	Credit point name	Status
Albania	60	30	Pikët ECTS	EHEA member
Austria	60	25	ECTS (also ECTS-Punkte, ECTS credits)	EHEA member
Belgium	60	25–30	ECTS (also studiepunten, crédits, ECTS)	EHEA member
Bosnia and Herzegovina	60	25	ECTS bodovi	EHEA member
Bulgaria	60	25–30	кредити	EHEA member
Croatia	60	25–30	ECTS bodovi	EHEA member
Cyprus	60	30	ECTS	EHEA member
Czech Republic	60	26	kredity	EHEA member
Denmark	60	28	ECTS-point	EHEA member
Estonia	60	26	ainepunkt (EAP). Currently because many students are still used to the older system the longer name 'euroopa ainepunkt' is more often used for clarity's sake	EHEA member
European Union	60	25–30	ECTS credits	EHEA member
Finland	60	27	opintopiste (op) / studiepoäng (Swedish) (lit. study point)	EHEA member
France	60	25–30	crédits ECTS	EHEA member
Georgia	60	25	კრედიტები (kreditebi)	EHEA member
Germany	60	25–30	ECTS, Leistungspunkte (LP), Kreditpunkte (KP), Credit Points (CP) or Credits	EHEA member
Greece	60	30	ECTS, Credit Points (CP), Μονάδες Φόρτου Εργασίας (Διδακτικές Μονάδες - Δ.Μ) or Credits	EHEA member
Hungary	60	30	kredit (pont)	EHEA member
Iceland	60	25–30	einingar (units)	EHEA member
Ireland	60		ECTS	EHEA member
Italy	60	25–30	crediti formativi universitari (CFU)	EHEA member
Latvia	60	30	ECTS kredītpunkts (1 "Latvian" credit point (kredītpunkts) equals 1.5 ECTS)	EHEA member
Liechtenstein	60			EHEA member
Lithuania	60	28	kreditai; ECTS kreditai	EHEA member
Luxembourg	60	25–30	ECTS	EHEA member
Malta	60	25	ECTS-credits	EHEA member
Montenegro	60		ECTS-krediti	EHEA member
Netherlands	60	28	studiepunten (ECTS or EC)	EHEA member
North Macedonia	60		кредити (ECTS)	EHEA member
Norway	60	25–30	studiepoeng	EHEA member
Poland	60	25–30	punkty ECTS	EHEA member
Portugal	60	28	créditos ECTS	EHEA member
Romania	60	30	credite (SECTS)	EHEA member
Russia	60	30	кредиты	EHEA member
Serbia	60	30	ЕСПБ бодови / ESPB bodovi	EHEA member
Slovakia	60	25	kredity	EHEA member
Slovenia	60	25–30	kreditne točke	EHEA member
Spain	60	25–30	ECTS (also créditos' and crèdits)	EHEA member
Sweden	60	26.667	högskolepoäng (Used from July 2007)	EHEA member
Switzerland	60	25–30	ECTS-credits, Kreditpunkte (KP)	EHEA member
Turkey	60	25–30	AKTS - kredi	EHEA member
Ukraine	60	30	кредити	EHEA member
United Kingdom (England, Wales and Northern Ireland)	120 (60 ECTS)	10 (20 hours per ECTS)	Credits. One ECTS credit is equivalent to two UK credits.	EHEA member
United Kingdom (Scotland)	120 (60 ECTS)	10 (20 hours per ECTS)	SCQF credit points. Two SCQF points equal one ECTS point.	EHEA member
Vatican	60	25–30	crediti formativi universitari (CFU) / ECTS	EHEA member

== Credit Harmonization across regions ==
=== Latin America ===
UNESCO's 2026 study, Mapping Academic Credit Systems in Latin America and the Caribbean, highlights the region's efforts to adapt ECTS principles without establishing a unified equivalent. Over the past two decades, initiatives such as the 6x4 Latin American Academic Credit System (SICA), the Tuning Latin America Project (CLAR) and the CSUCA Qualifications Framework (MCESCA) have contributed to defining and harmonizing academic credits. Meanwhile, Argentina, Chile and Paraguay show closer alignment with ECTS, requiring 25-30 hours of student workload per credit.

== See also ==
- Educational policies and initiatives of the European Union
- Bologna Process
- European Higher Education Area
- ECTS grading scale
- Carnegie Unit and Student Hour
- Erasmus Programme
- Academic mobility
