= European Higher Education Area =

Region committed to higher education in Europe

EHEA
- Formation: March 2010
- Location: Europe
- Members: 49 states
- Website: ehea.info

The European Higher Education Area (EHEA) was launched in March 2010, during the Budapest-Vienna Ministerial Conference, on the occasion of the 10th anniversary of the Bologna Process.

As the main objective of the Bologna Process since its inception in 1999, the EHEA was meant to ensure more comparable, compatible and coherent higher education systems in Europe. Between 1999 and 2010, all the efforts of the Bologna Process members were targeted to creating the European Higher Education Area, which became reality with the Budapest-Vienna Declaration of March 2010. In order to join the EHEA, a country must sign and ratify the European Cultural Convention treaty.

European Higher Education Area EHEA member states Suspended EHEA member states (Belarus, Russia) European Cultural Convention signatory states eligible to join EHEA (Monaco)

Denmark was the first country outside the UK and the US to introduce the 3+2+3 system.

== General objectives ==
The key objectives are promoting the mobility of students and staff, the employability of graduates and the European dimension in higher education. Coping with the diversity of their national systems, the EHEA members agree to adopt:

- A common system of easily readable and comparable diplomas;
- A framework based mainly on three main cycles: bachelor, master, doctorate;
- A common quality assurance system.

== Main actions ==
=== Student mobility and mutual recognition of diplomas ===
Student mobility implies a coherent system of studies and diplomas:

- The ECTS credit system facilitates the recognition of study periods between EHEA institutions. An academic year normally corresponds to the validation of 60 credits; one credit needs approximately 25 to 30 hours of student work (courses, projects, personal work, etc.).
- The Framework for Qualifications of the European Higher Education Area defines 3 main cycles (first cycle, second cycle and third cycle). Each cycle is defined by the number of credits required and the description of the learning outcomes and skills expected for each graduate:
  - The first cycle (180 to 240 ECTS credits), generally leading to a bachelor's degree.
  - The second cycle (60 to 120 ECTS credits), generally leading to a master's degree.
  - The 3rd cycle, leading to a doctoral degree.
- In 2018, a short cycle was introduced (90 to 120 ECTS).

=== Quality assurance ===
The European area does not aim to standardize national higher education systems, but to make them more readable and to build mutual trust between higher education institutions. The mutual recognition of diplomas is based, not on the comparison of the content of the programs, but on the definition and validation of the targeted learning outcomes. From its origin, the need for a common quality assurance system arose in the EHEA. The European Association for Quality Assurance in Higher Education (ENQA) was responsible for defining the standards and guidelines, which are broken down into 3 chapters:

- Internal quality assurance in institutions: each institution must have a policy and an internal organization of self-assessment and continuous improvement, implemented with all its stakeholders (students, staff, former graduates and representatives of society and employers).
- External quality assurance: institutions must submit their organization and results to external and independent evaluations (including accreditation agencies).
- Quality assurance of accreditation agencies: the agencies must act in full autonomy (in particular from public or private powers) to evaluate the institutions and their training, and to bring the results to the attention of the public.

=== European programs ===
==== Erasmus and Erasmus Mundus programs ====
The Erasmus and Erasmus Mundus Programs are initiatives of the European Union to promote the mobility of students and teachers. They therefore primarily concern the 27 countries of the Union, with which other countries such as Norway, Iceland and Turkey have joined forces. Strictly speaking, these are not programs of the European Area, but they largely contribute to its development.

==== European Universities initiative ====
In 2017, the European Union launched the European Universities initiative through the Erasmus+ programme, with "the ambition to support at least 60 European Universities alliances involving more than 500 higher education institutions by mid-2024". The first 19 alliances were launched in 2019, followed by 24 in a second round in 2020, and further rounds in 2022, 2023 and 2024, leading to 64 European Universities alliances covering over 560 institutions across 35 European countries, including all 27 EU member states, as of 2024. A further nine proposed alliances were awarded the 'seal of excellence' quality label but not funded through Erasmus+. European University alliances also include over 2,000 associate partners, which can include higher education institutions from other (non-Erasmus+) EHEA countries as well as non-educational partners such as private sector companies and public authorities.

In 2023, the European Commission announced over €3 million in funding to support universities from Ukraine and the western Balkans joining European Universities alliances as associate members, leading to almost 30 Ukrainian universities joining alliances in that round. However, the UK and Switzerland, which do not participate in Erasmus+, have only limited involvement as universities from those countries have to pay a membership fee and are limited to being associated partners. The UK will rejoin Erasmus+, including the European Universities alliances, in 2027. Switzerland also plans to rejoin Erasmus+ from 2027.

== Members ==
Participating member states of the European Higher Education Area are:

- Albania
- Andorra
- Armenia
- Austria
- Azerbaijan
- Belarus (suspended)
- Belgium
- Bosnia and Herzegovina
- Bulgaria
- Croatia
- Cyprus
- Czech Republic
- Denmark
- Estonia
- Finland
- France
- Georgia
- Germany
- Greece
- Hungary
- Iceland
- Ireland
- Italy
- Kazakhstan
- Latvia
- Liechtenstein
- Lithuania
- Luxembourg
- Malta
- Moldova
- Montenegro
- Netherlands
- North Macedonia
- Norway
- Poland
- Portugal
- Romania
- Russia (suspended)
- San Marino
- Serbia
- Slovakia
- Slovenia
- Spain
- Sweden
- Switzerland
- Turkey
- Ukraine
- United Kingdom
- Holy See

Countries eligible to join:

- Monaco

== Public international law standards ==
- Lisbon Recognition Convention (Lisbon, 4 July 1997)
- Article 2 of the first Protocol to the European Convention on Human Rights (Paris, 20 March 1952)
- Article 10 of the European Social Charter (revised, Strasbourg, 3 May 1996)

== Documents ==
- Main documents

== Note ==
The two first sections are widely extracted from the French Wikipedia page Espace Européen de l'Enseignement Supérieur, with its list of authors

== See also ==
- Directorate-General for Education and Culture
- Bologna process
- Diploma Supplement
- Erasmus programme
- European Credit Transfer System (ECTS)
- Homologation
- Category:Lists of universities and colleges
- European Research Area (ERA)
- TEMPUS
- Lisbon Recognition Convention
