= Diploma Supplement =

The Diploma Supplement is a document accompanying a European higher education diploma, providing a standardised description of the nature, level, context, content and status of the studies completed by its holder.

== Overview ==
The Diploma Supplement is designed to provide a description of the nature, level, context, content and status of the studies that were successfully completed by the individual named on the original qualification to which the supplement is appended. It should be free from any value judgements, equivalence statements or suggestions about recognition. The Diploma Supplement provides a common structure to translate qualifications across the EU. It is a flexible, non-prescriptive tool which has been shown to save time, money and workload by an EU working party.

Diploma Supplements were gradually implemented at European universities as part of the Bologna Process, since approximately 1999. Students graduating from European Universities since this date, and depending on what year the country in which their university is located became signatory to his Process, typically will have received a Diploma Supplement. However, even as late as 2013 there were still some European universities, who despite their country's years-old membership of the Bologna Process, had not yet finished the necessary procedures for issuing Diploma Supplements to their graduates.

It is important for countries and educational institutions located outside of the European Higher Education Area to realize that Diploma Supplements cannot be retroactively issued, hence why students who graduated before their institution's country became signatory to the Bologna Convention cannot possibly have a diploma supplement for that degree. Consequently, requesting a Diploma Supplement from a student who graduated from a European university in 1995 or earlier is not possible since the Bologna Process was not even in place before that date.

== See also ==
- Lisbon Recognition Convention
- Bologna Process
