= National Academic Recognition Information Centre =

Organization

All EU and EEA states and all the associated countries in Central and Eastern Europe and Cyprus have a designated National Academic Recognition Information Centre (NARIC), which provides a way to compare academic qualifications as part of the Bologna Process. Together they form the NARIC network.

Individual NARICs are coordinated by the NARIC Network, an initiative of the European Commission to improve recognition of academic qualifications and study between European countries. It is part of the commission's SOCRATES/ERASMUS programme, aimed at improving the mobility of students and staff between higher education institutions.

Each country's NARIC is designated by its Ministry of Education, but they differ in status and scope of work. In most European countries, institutions of higher education make their own decision on what foreign qualifications or study they will accept, and so most NARICs have only an advisory role.

== See also ==
- ENIC, the wider UNESCO/Council of Europe network for the same purpose.
