= European Network of Information Centres =

- Abbreviation: ENIC
- Formation: 1994
- Region served: Global
- Members: 54 (2022)
- Website: ENIC-NARIC

The European Network of Information Centres (ENIC) were established in 1994 as a joint initiative of UNESCO and the Council of Europe. They are intended to implement the Lisbon recognition convention (LRC) and, in general, to develop policy and practice for the recognition of qualifications. The ENIC Network works closely with the NARIC network of the European Union.

ENIC legally complies with Article X.1(b) and X.3 of the LRC.

== Network and members ==
The network is made up of several countries, where each country represents a party, and each party appoints a National information Centre as a member of the ENIC Network. In this sense, each country or a member holds one vote. There is an annual meeting where all the members meet. ENIC also elects three official representatives to the ENIC Bureau (EB) for a two-year mandate. There are a total of 54 members; ENIC usually offers the following information for its members:

- National Information Centres
- National education bodies
- System of education
- University education
- Quality Assurance in Higher Education
- Post-secondary non-university education
- Recognised higher education institutions
- Policies and procedures for the recognition of qualifications
- Recognition of Qualifications held by Refugees
- Qualifications Framework
- Diploma Supplement Information
- Access to higher education
- Verification sources
