= Education in Lithuania =

Ministry of Education, Science and Sport
- Minister of Education, Science and Sport: Raminta Popovienė

National education budget (2024)
- Budget: €3.8 billion

General details
- Primary languages: Lithuanian
- System type: National

Literacy (2021)
- Total: 99.83%
- Male: 99.81%
- Female: 99.85%

Enrollment
- Total: 748,378
- Primary: 90,552
- Secondary: 514,622
- Post secondary: 143,204
- 2006 data 2021 literacy data

The first documented school in Lithuania was established in 1387 at Vilnius Cathedral. The school network was influenced by the Christianization of Lithuania. Several types of schools were present in medieval Lithuania – cathedral schools, where pupils were prepared for priesthood; parish schools, offering elementary education; and home schools dedicated to educating the children of the Lithuanian nobility. Before Vilnius University was established in 1579, Lithuanians seeking higher education attended universities in foreign cities, including Kraków, Prague, and Leipzig, among others. During the Interbellum a national university – Vytautas Magnus University was founded in Kaunas.

Education is free of charge and compulsory from the age of 6 or 7 to 16 years (covering "primary" and "basic" education), as stated in the national Law on Education. In 1996, the gross primary enrollment rate was 98 percent. Primary school attendance rates were unavailable for Lithuania as of 2001. While enrollment rates indicate a level of commitment to education, they do not always reflect children's participation in school.

Pre-tertiary education is organised in four main cycles: Pre-school education (until age 5 or 6), pre-primary education (1 year, between ages 5 to 7), primary education (4 years, between ages 6 to 11), basic education (6 years, between ages 10 to 17, ends on a "basic education certificate"), upper secondary education (two years, between ages 16 to 19). Upper secondary education ends on the "matura" examination, opening gates to tertiary education. Vocational and technical education starts at the fifth year of basic education (age 14-15). Its structure is similar to comprehensive education: The program lasts two to three years before the "basic education certificate". Students can then pursue into vocational upper secondary education, that also leads, after two or three years, to a "matura" examination. However, in order to reach tertiary education (university or college), vocational students have to follow an extra "post-secondary" education program of 2 years.

Tertiary education can be divided into universities and colleges. Universities offer an academic education leading to international Bachelor-Master-PhD degrees (Lithuania implemented the Bologna process in 2006). Colleges offer vocational Education. Since 2006, they can award professional bachelor's degrees.

The school year in Lithuania usually starts on the first of September, including in tertiary education.

== Primary education ==
According to the Law on Education, children who have reached seven years of age must go to the 1st form. If parents wish so and if the child is sufficiently mature to study under the primary education programme, they can start attending school from six years of age. The duration of the primary education programme is four years. Compulsory primary education can be obtained in kindergartens / schools, in primary schools and, which is less common, in basic or secondary schools.

Parents and children can also choose non-traditional education schools or individual classes/groups in municipal schools. Montessori, Waldorf, Suzuki pedagogical systems can be chosen in Lithuania.

Achievements and progress of 1–4 form pupils is not assessed with marks. Assessment is based on the idiographic principle, i.e. individual child's progress made with regard to their personality is assessed and a criteria-referenced assessment is applied. Pupils are provided with assessment information orally or in form of a short description of their particular achievements. In the end of the trimester, semester or academic year, a summarised assessment is carried out by indicating the educational level achieved (satisfactory, basic, higher).

Children who attend schools for national minorities start learning Lithuanian (state language) from the 1st form. Most primary school pupils start learning the first foreign language (English) in the 2nd form (some start in 1st form, depending on the school).

== Secondary education ==
=== Foundation education ===
Upon completion of primary education, pupils start studying under the 6-year basic education programme. The foundation education programme is implemented by foundation (similar to pre-A-level schools in the UK), secondary and vocational schools and gymnasiums.

The compulsory foundation education programme consists of two parts: part I – a 4-year programme implemented in the 5-8th forms and part II – a 2-year programme implemented in the 9-10th forms (forms 1-2 in gymnasiums). Pupils can start learning the second foreign language in the 5th form and in the 6th form the second foreign language is compulsory. Most students choose to learn English, with its popularity underlined by the fact that in 2011 it was estimated that 80% of 15-19 year olds in 2011 can speak English. In addition, Russian has declined in popularity, in favour of English. Pupils who study under the foundation education programme are to be encouraged to be engaged in various social activities, e.g. volunteering, organising events, raising funds for charity.

In form 10 (form 2 in gymnasiums), pupils are able to choose subject modules and study optional subjects following their bent and abilities.

Foreign pupils who can't speak Lithuanian but wish to study in Lithuanian schools have the option to study for one extra year, during which they have integration activities and language lessons.

English is the prime foreign language, however, in 2022, around 70% of students chose Russian as a second foreign language in preference to French or German.

In Lithuania, education is compulsory for children under 16. Compulsory education is usually provided up to the 10th form. Upon completion of the 10th form pupils can choose to undergo an Assessment of Foundation Education test (AFE; PUPP in Lithuanian). During these examinations, 2 to 3 subject skills are assessed: Lithuanian language, Mathematics and native language if it is not Lithuanian (e.g. Polish, Russian). After passing the exams, pupils can choose to study in a secondary school that focuses on academics, or undergo vocational training.

=== Grading system ===
The usual grading system at the secondary school level is a ten-point scale.

Result	Grade	Short description in Lithuanian	Short description in English
Pass	10	Puikiai	Excellent
Pass	9	Labai gerai	Very good
Pass	8	Gerai	Good
Pass	7	Pakankamai gerai	Good enough
Pass	6	Patenkinamai	Satisfactory
Pass	5	Pakankamai patenkinamai	Satisfactory enough
Pass	4	Silpnai	Weak
Fail	3	Blogai	Bad
Fail	2	Labai blogai	Very bad
Fail	1	Nieko neatsakė, neatliko užduoties	Nothing answered, task was not completed

Secondary education is not compulsory and is usually provided for two years (forms 11 and 12 in secondary schools and forms 3 and 4 in gymnasiums). Pupils study according to individual education plans. The programme can include modules of the vocational training programme. Secondary education is provided in secondary schools, gymnasiums, and vocational schools.

Pupils can also choose education which mostly corresponds to their values, world outlook, religious beliefs, and philosophical views. Such education is provided in non-traditional education schools. Non-traditional education schools may operate according to their own programmes, but the total number of subjects and the total number of hours allocated for each subject in forms 1-12 can differ from the numbers specified in the state general education plans by not more than 25 percent.

=== Maturity examinations ===
In spring, upon completion of the secondary education programme, school-leavers take maturity examinations. Matura examinations may be of two types, i.e. school-level or national-level. To be awarded a Maturity Certificate, two maturity examinations must be passed: a compulsory exam in Lithuanian and one more optional exam. School-leavers who wish to enter higher education schools and receive state funding (except for studies of Arts), must pass at least 3 maturity examinations. In total, 6 maturity exams may be taken.

State examinations are conducted centrally — pupils of the graduation forms are registered in the database of the National Examination Centre; examinations are taken in municipal examinations centres; examination papers are encoded and sent to the National Examination Centre where they are assessed by hired experts.

Having completed the secondary education programme and passed maturity examinations, school-leavers obtain secondary education.

Secondary and higher education obtained in other countries is assessed by the Lithuanian Centre for Quality Assessment in Higher Education.

=== Financing ===
Education of pupils in general education schools is financed through a state budget target grant under the principle of the pupil's voucher. Every year, the state allocates, by taking into account the number of pupils, a special target grant to municipalities. The pupil's voucher is allocated both for public and private schools. When moving to another school, a pupil takes his voucher with him. The pupil's voucher includes money for teachers' salaries, improvement of teachers' skills, textbooks, instructional aids, special psychological aid, cognitive activities of pupils, professional guidance, modules of professional artistic education programmes, administration, execution, assessment of maturity examinations, etc.

Utility expenses of private schools are covered by their stakeholders. Funds for schools of traditional religious communities are allocated by the state under the Agreement between the Republic of Lithuania and the Holy See.

== Non-formal education ==
After classes, pupils can choose various leisure activities provided in schools free of charge or attend separate sports, music, fine arts, art, aviation, and choreography schools, and children's clubs. The latter activities are partially paid; professional artists, sportsmen, and teachers work with children.

In schools, pupils can be excused from attending weekly classes in Arts and Physical Training, if they have graduated from schools of art or study Fine Arts, Choreography, or Music in schools of art or non-formal education establishments specializing in sports. The long-term artistic education programme completed in children's music, art, and sports schools or any other school can be recognised as a vocational education module.

=== Special education ===
Special education is provided in pre-school education establishments and general education schools of all types. If needed, general education programmes can be adapted taking into account pupil's special education needs. Free assistance of special pedagogues, speech therapists, psychologists, and other specialists can be provided to pupils in schools as well as to parents and teachers in other institutions. A child's need for special education is determined by a municipal pedagogical psychological unit or by a school special education commission.

== Vocational training and life long learning ==
=== Vocational training ===
The vocational education system covers initial and continuing vocational education and training

Initial Vocational Education and Training (IVET) can start at the age 14 (fifth year of basic education). The duration of the first programmes can be either two or three years depending on the level of the audience. The duration of studies for students who have already obtained secondary education is 1 to 1.5 years. It grants a certificate of basic education. The student can then pursue into vocational upper secondary education, that also lasts 2 or 3 years and ends on a "matura" examination. In order to join tertiary education (university or college), vocational students have to follow an extra "post-secondary education" program (1 or 2 years).

The training programme consists of two parts. The first part is common to all schools in the country and defines fields of professional activities, competencies, teaching goals, and assessment provisions. The second part is optional and covers teaching methods, subject programmes, teaching aids, etc. The programme must include the subjects or modules of Entrepreneurship, Civil Protection, Ecology, Information Technologies, and Foreign Language for Specific Purposes. 60-70 percent of the total time allocated to vocational subjects should be devoted to practical training. Usually, practical training is conducted at the school or in a company. Training can also be performed under exchange programmes.

Initial vocational training is financed through the state budget. Vocational training providers receive financing by applying the methodology of the pupil's voucher, i.e. calculation of teaching funds per pupil. The same principle is applied when allocating utility funds. Most of vocational school pupils receive grants. Continuing education is usually conducted through the funds of companies, institutions, the Employment Fund, other funds, or personal funds of pupils. Requirements for vocational training programmes are set out by the General Requirements and Standards for Vocational Training of the Ministry of Education and Science. Vocational training programmes are developed by vocational training providers in cooperation with employers.

Continuing Vocational Education and Training (CVET) targets learners older than 18. It consists of programmes, usually short (a year or less), mainly dedicated to practical training (60 to 80% of the programme). They can lead to a vocational qualification, to an additional vocational qualification, or to a competence to perform jobs or functions regulated by law.

=== Adult education ===
Once students have reached 18 years of age, they are offered a variety of opportunities for further education. It is possible to continue one's education in general education schools and centres for adults, by taking various courses or just using the Internet, reading books, or being interested in special literature.

Adults can obtain primary, basic or secondary education in adult schools, education centres, and general education schools with forms established for adults. General education of adults is organised by approx. 60 institutions in all municipalities of the country, which number about 12 thousand adults. These schools also provide non-formal adult education services.

The scope and subjects of study programmes for adults are adapted according to the needs. Adults who study under general education and non-formal education programmes can choose a flexible learning form that is most suitable for them — modular education, independent education, extramural education, or distance education. These forms allow adults choosing suitable time for their studies and a study programme, as well as planning their learning process on their own.

The modular learning method creates opportunities to study single subjects and complete the selected education programme within acceptable time frames as well as study for the purposes of self-education. Extramural students arrive to the adult school only for consultations and to take credit tests. Part of consultations under the correspondence and individual programmes (and all consultations for disabled people) can be provided distantly, by communicating with teachers with the help of information communication technologies — Internet sites, e-mail, or Internet Telephony Programs.

Adults study not only in order to obtain formal education, but also for self-expression, improvement of their skills, or communication with other people. On non-formal adult education courses and seminars adults tend mostly like to study foreign languages, Basics of Law and Business, Psychology, Computer Literacy as well as Arts, Literature, and Philosophy. Improvement of competencies in citizenship, traffic safety, and career management is also important. Non-formal adult education is organised by approx. 700 public and private institutions. Adult learning also takes place in the workplace and is organised by the employers taking into account their business demands.

=== Improvement of teachers' skills ===
During an academic year, teachers shall allocate five days for improvement of their skills. Every municipality has a teacher education centre, in which teachers can improve their qualification. These services are also provided by various private institutions.

There is a system implemented for the appraisal of teachers. The Regulations of the Appraisal of Teachers specify four teacher qualification categories: teacher, senior teacher, teacher-supervisor, and teacher-expert. Teachers or specialists in assisting the student can undergo appraisal at their own choice and in accordance with the procedure established in the Regulations, and pursue acquisition of any qualification category in one or several subjects (education fields, vocational training programmes).

Since 2010, students who enter pedagogical studies shall take a motivation test. The motivation test allows selecting the mostly motivated students. Future pedagogues with the best achievements receive an incentive – an additional target grant.

== Pre-school and pre-primary education ==
Pre-school education under the pre-school education programme is provided to children from 1 to 6 years old. Institutional pre-school education is not compulsory and is provided upon parents' request. This kind of education can be compulsory in individual cases (to children from social risk families, etc.). Pre-school education is provided by public and private nurseries-kindergartens, kindergartens, and kindergartens-schools.

Pre-primary education is provided for one year. Education is provided to 6-year-old (in exceptional cases five-year-old) children and is intended to better prepare children for school entry. Education is free, universally available, but is not compulsory. Parents have the right to decide whether their six-year-old child should be educated under the pre-primary education programme or not.

Pre-primary education groups are established in kindergartens or schools. In remote villages, municipalities can establish such groups in community multi-functional centres or children can be brought by school buses free of charge to the nearest school, where such group has been established. The following flexible pre-primary group models are offered to municipalities: groups working a few days per week, at weekends, or during school holidays, groups of a camp type, etc.

Children attending pre-primary groups learn new skills which will be useful in school: to interact with age-mates and stranger adults and orient themselves in a new environment. The following competencies are mostly developed through games: social, health protection, world recognition, and artistic.

If a child is educated at home, their parents are informed about pre-primary education novelties and consulted on important child's education issues. Upon parents' request, children can be provided with special pedagogic and psychological assistance.

== Structural funding problems in Lithuanian education system ==
Regional disparities (high investments in largest cities, and lack of investments in other areas) is an issue in funding state institutions, including education. This creates difficulties on coordination on funding in different regions. European Commission's Audit flagged up the major problems regarding weak coordination at national, regional and local levels. Same audit noted the lack of a system for the recognition of non-formal and informal learning, insufficient information on learning opportunities and unclear funding priorities.

School attendance rates are above EU average and school leave is less common than EU average. However, PISA report from 2010 found that Lithuanian results in math, science and reading were below OECD average. PISA report from 2015 reconfirmed these findings.

Salaries are a major issue and a point of frequent debate. Despite significant growth since 2009/2010, Lithuanian teacher salaries were significantly below the EU average in 2023. Low teacher pay was the primary reason behind national teacher strikes in 2014, 2015, 2016, 2018and 2023.

Lithuanian universities are also notorious locally for low wages. In 2017, university researchers earned below €600 a month. The monthly salary of a professor is between €1150–1990, and for associate professors between €890–1320. Lecturers earn between €553–1040 a month and assistants receive €345–762 per month. A number of Lithuanian professors supplement their income by having a second job, often as a taxi driver. There are reported cases of university professors with four part-time jobs. Other reported cases concern professors who emigrate because they cannot support themselves on their Lithuanian salary. Lithuanian higher education salaries are among EU's lowest and 90% of Lithuanian university staff are unhappy with their income and 70% consider going to strike.

Emigration among higher education professionals is rampant, but this is normal and to be expected according to Viktoras Pranckietis, speaker of the house at the Lithuanian parliament. According to parliamentarian Mantas Adomėnas, problem with low salaries is well known, but education is not a politically prioritised matter in Lithuania. Low salaries is one of the primary reasons why some areas in Lithuania are experiencing a massive shortage of qualified teachers.

The Lithuanian parliament intends to reorganise the higher education system by reducing the number of universities in Lithuania. There has been concerns of low education quality at some entities. In 2006, Mathematics and IT department at Šiauliai University marketed programs in esotericism. As of 2012, Šiauliai University continued to offer courses in astrology and palmistry. In 2011, Šiauliai University successfully silenced student protest regarding low education quality. Plans to reduce the number of educational institutions have been criticised by university rectors and university associations but are moving forward.

On a national level, there are concerns regarding inefficient use of funds, lack of international collaboration and low funding for research and innovation. In 2017, none of Lithuanian higher education organisations were involved in EU's largest research projects – Graphene Flagship, CERN, Human Brain Project or others.
