= Lisbon Recognition Convention =

European convention

Lisbon Recognition Convention CET 165
Convention on the Recognition of Qualifications concerning Higher Education in the European Region
- Signed: 11 April 1997
- Location: Lisbon, Portugal
- Effective: 1 February 1999
- Condition: Ratifications including 3 member States of the Council of Europe and/or the UNESCO Europe Region.
- Parties: 57 (all Council of Europe member states), as well as Australia, Belarus, Canada, Holy See, Israel, Kazakhstan, Kyrghyz Republic, Turkmenistan, New Zealand and Tajikistan
- Depositary: Secretary General of the Council of Europe and Director-General of UNESCO
- Languages: English and French

The Lisbon Recognition Convention, officially the Convention on the Recognition of Qualifications concerning Higher Education in the European Region, is an international convention jointly developed by the Council of Europe and UNESCO. This is the main legal agreement on credential evaluation in Europe.

As of 2026, the convention has been ratified by 57 states, including all member states the Council of Europe in Strasbourg and 56 members of UNESCO. It has also been ratified by the Council of Europe non-member states Australia, Belarus, Canada, the Holy See, Israel, Kazakhstan, Kyrgyzstan, Tajikistan, Turkmenistan and New Zealand. The United States has signed but not ratified the convention. The Lisbon Recognition Convention is the only international legal treaty of the European Higher Education Area, and all EHEA member States have ratified the Convention.

The Convention and subsidiary documents are milestones in the enhancement of fair recognition of educational achievements across borders. Noteworthy subsidiary documents are:

- The Recommendation on Criteria and Procedures for the Assessment of Foreign Qualifications
- The Recommendation on Recognition of Qualifications Held by Refugees, Displaced Persons and Persons in a Refugee-like Situation
- The Recommendation on the Use of Qualifications Frameworks in the Recognition of Foreign Qualifications

In a 2025 publication on the history and relevance of the Lisbon Recognition Convention, it is argued that the Convention has made recognition more student-centered, and that further recognition progress can be achieved by better articulation or learning outcomes.

== Aims ==
The Convention stipulates that degrees and periods of study must be recognised unless substantial differences can be proved by the institution that is charged with recognition. Students and graduates are guaranteed fair procedures under the convention. It is named after Lisbon, Portugal, where it was signed in 1997, and entered into force on 1 February 1999. For countries acceding after that date, the entry into force starts at the date when these submit their instruments of ratification.

== Convention bodies ==
The convention established two bodies which oversee, promote and facilitate the implementation of the convention:

1. the Committee of the convention on the Recognition of Qualifications concerning Higher Education in the European Region, and
2. the European Network of Information Centres on Academic Mobility and Recognition (the ENIC Network).

The committee is responsible for promoting the application of the convention and overseeing its implementation. To this end, it can adopt, by a majority of the Signatory Parties, recommendations, declarations, protocols and models of good practice to guide the competent authorities of the Parties. Before making its decisions, the Committee seeks the opinion of the ENIC Network. As for the ENIC Network, it upholds and assists the practical implementation of the convention by the competent national authorities.

== European Higher Education Area (Bologna Process) ==
The Lisbon Recognition Convention is an important instrument for the European higher education area (also known as the Bologna Process).

== Historical background ==
The possibility for students to study abroad has been recognised as an essential element of European integration since the foundation of the Council of Europe in 1949. Within the Council of Europe, several international treaties were elaborated in this field: starting with the right to education under Article 2 of the first Protocol of 1952 to the European Convention on Human Rights, the European Convention on the Equivalence of Diplomas leading to Admission to Universities was opened for signature in 1953, the European Convention on the Equivalence of Periods of University Study in 1956, the European Convention on the Academic Recognition of University Qualifications in 1959, the European Agreement on continued Payment of Scholarships to students studying abroad in 1969, and the European Convention on the General Equivalence of Periods of University Study in 1990.

In addition, under Article 2 of the Council of Europe's European Cultural Convention of 1954, each Contracting Party shall, insofar as may be possible: encourage the study by its own nationals of the languages, history and civilisation of the other Contracting Parties and grant facilities to those Parties to promote such studies in its territory; and endeavour to promote the study of its language or languages, history and civilisation in the territory of the other Contracting Parties and grant facilities to the nationals of those Parties to pursue such studies in its territory.
