= Anis Shorrosh =

Palestinian evangelical Christian

- أنيس شروش
- Born: January 6, 1933; Nazareth, British Mandate Palestine
- Died: May 13, 2018 (aged 85); Mobile, Alabama
- Education: New Orleans Baptist Theological Seminary; Luther Rice Seminary; Oxford Graduate School
- Occupations: author, speaker, and pastor
- Known for: the view that armed Jihad and violence are central to Islam
- Notable work: The True Furqan (translator)

Anis Shorrosh (Arabic: أنيس شروش; January 6, 1933 – May 13, 2018) was a Palestinian Evangelical Christian author, speaker, and pastor who wrote many books and participated in debates with Muslim author Ahmad Deedat.

== Biography ==
Born in Nazareth, he became a refugee in Jordan during the Arab-Israeli War, and later immigrated to the United States with the assistance of missionaries. He earned two degrees from Baptist seminaries, including a doctorate. Shorrosh graduated from New Orleans Baptist Theological Seminary in 1959 and later received a Doctorate of Ministries from Luther Rice Seminary and a Doctorate of Philosophy from Oxford Graduate School. He served as a pastor and evangelist in the Middle East from 1959 to 1966.

In his 1988 book, Islam Revealed, Shorrosh presented "armed Jihad and violence as central to Islam". He authored ten books, including The Liberated Palestinian, The True Furqan; Jesus, Prophecy, and The Middle East; and Islam; A Threat or A Challenge. Shorrosh translated The True Furqan from Arabic to English, intending to challenge the Quran.

In September 1995, he was a guest lecturer at NCI Bible College, Auckland, New Zealand. Between 2004 and 2005, he embarked on a worldwide tour, delivering lectures and engaging in debates. In 2001, he lived in Fairhope, Alabama.

On Friday, May 2, 2008, he was arrested and charged with first degree attempted arson for allegedly burning tax records of his religious organization in an attempt to set his building on fire.

Shorrosh, age 85, died peacefully on May 13, 2018, at Providence Hospital in Mobile, Alabama.

== See also ==
- Evangelicalism
- Palestinian Christians
