= Quebec College Diploma =

Quebec's system of college education results in multiple types college degrees with diplomas. In the CEGEP-era, pre-university programs result in "diplomas", as do technical studies that result in associate degree analogues, while the vocational programs result in "attestations".

== CEGEP-era ==
- Quebec Diploma of College Studies (English: DCS; French: Diplôme d'études collégiales, DEC) for preuniversity studies, equivalent to a junior college prep school
- Quebec Diploma of College Studies (English: DCS; French: Diplôme d'études collégiales, DEC) for technical studies, analogue to a university college associate's degree
- Quebec Attestation of College Studies (English: ACS; French: Attestation d'études collégiales, AEC) for vocational studies, like the trade school community college

== See also ==
- High school diploma
- Associate's degree
- College degree
