= Omega Graduate School =

- Motto: Qui Facit Per Alium Facit Per Se
- Type: Private graduate school
- Established: 1980
- Chancellor: David Anderson
- President: Joshua D. Reichard
- Faculty: 4
- Students: 62
- Location: Dayton, Tennessee, United States; 35.4679°N 85.0536°W
- Campus: Rural
- Website: ogs.edu

Omega Graduate School (formerly Oxford Graduate School) is a private graduate school near Dayton, Tennessee. Omega Graduate School is accredited by the Transnational Association of Christian Colleges and Schools. Faculty are primarily Christian in their orientation, although OGS describes itself as "non-sectarian, non-profit, non-discriminatory, and non-partisan". It is also known as the American Centre for Research in the Social Sciences (ACRSS); and formerly known as the American Centre for Religion/Society Studies.

== History ==
Omega Graduate School traces its origins to the Oxford Task Force (1974–1981), a group of professionals who explored how higher education might foster constructive social change. The task force recommended establishing a freestanding graduate institution for mature adult learners that would integrate faith and the social sciences. The school was chartered in 1981 under the leadership of Hollis L. Green, who served as president and chancellor until 2008.

Located in the Crystal Springs community of Rhea County, Tennessee, the campus was developed in a retreat-like setting intended to provide opportunities for academic, personal, and spiritual growth. From its earliest years, the institution emphasized interdisciplinary research and the integration of religion and society, awarding degrees such as the Master of Letters (MLitt) in Family Life Education and Organizational Leadership, and the Doctor of Philosophy (DPhil/PhD) in social research.

The doctoral program was structured around coursework, research seminars, and a dissertation, with areas of study including social research, philosophy, leadership, and communications.

== Academics ==
The school offers a Master of Letters in Organizational Leadership, a Doctor of Philosophy in social research, a Doctor of Social Leadership, and non-degree graduate certificates. It is accredited by the Transnational Association of Christian Colleges and Schools.

== Campus ==
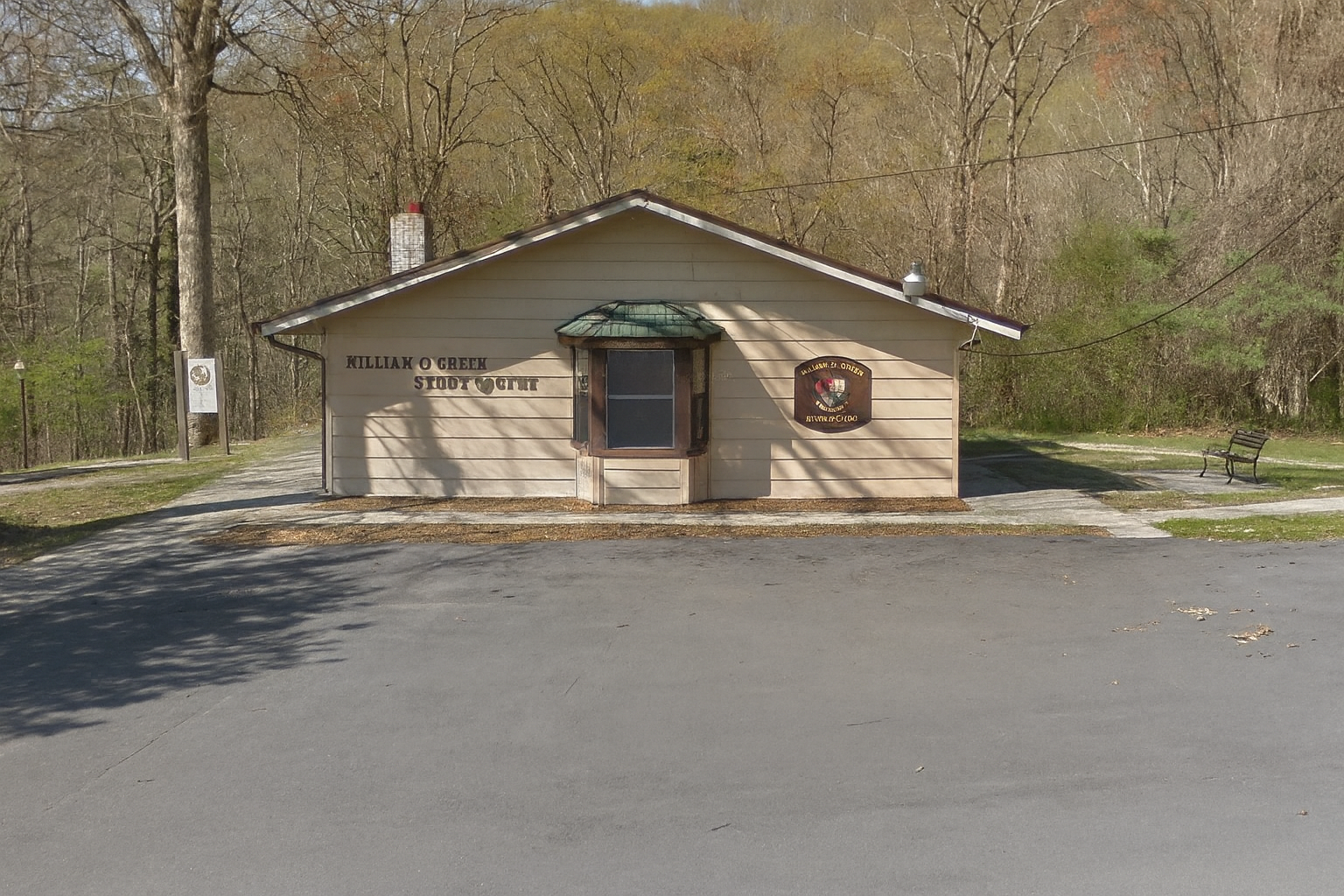
William O. Green Study Centre in Dayton, Tennessee

For much of its history, Omega Graduate School was located on a 25-acre campus west of State Highway 27 in Dayton, Tennessee. The campus consisted of six buildings constructed in a European architectural style. The administration building contained offices, classrooms, and meeting rooms, while the library and study center held a 68,000-volume collection, computer facilities, and student study areas. The library, organized by course number, functioned as a non-lending collection with 24-hour access during student residencies. Other facilities included a lodge with apartments and student housing, a multi-purpose hall known as the Gathering Place used for dining and group activities, and a chapel used for religious services, academic forums, and assemblies.

In 2021, most of the campus was sold to the Transformation Center, a Christian social service organization, as OGS transitioned from hybrid to distance learning. Omega Graduate School retained the William O. Green Study Centre (Library) at 500 Oxford Drive, along with approximately three acres of land, and continues to collaborate with the Transformation Center to provide facilities for students, faculty, and staff when needed.

== Notable alumni and faculty ==
- Carl F. Ellis Jr. (1946), theological anthropologist
- Ken Ruettgers (1962), professional football player
- Anis Shorrosh (1933–2018), Evangelical Christian author, speaker, and pastor
- Ken Steorts (1966), college president and musician
- E. Glenn Wagner, former chancellor (appointed 2010)
