= E. Glenn Wagner =

E. Glenn Wagner is an American pastor who worked as the chancellor of the Omega Graduate School. From 1997 to 2004, Wagner was senior pastor of the Calvary Church in Charlotte, North Carolina, before resigning due to plagiarism.
