= The True Furqan =

Arabic book with Christian elements in Qur'anic style

- Author: Al Saffee, Al Mahdee
- Original title: al-Furqān al-ḥaqq
- Translator: Anis Shorrosh
- Language: English, Arabic
- Genre: Religion
- Publisher: Wine Press Publishing, Enumclaw, WA
- Publication date: June 1999
- Publication place: United States
- Media type: Print (Hardback), Online edition
- Pages: 366
- ISBN: 9781579211752
- OCLC: 52725049

The True Furqan (Arabic: الفرقان الحق, romanized: al-Furqān al-ḥaqq) is a book written in Arabic that tries to imitate the Qur'an while incorporating elements of traditional Christian teaching.

== Reception ==
According to Baptist News, Al-Mahdy, a member of the executive committee of "Project Omega 2001" released The True Furqan in April 1999 saying that Muslims "have not received the true message of the gospel". The book is attributed to authors who go by the pseudonyms of "Al Saffee" and "Al Mahdee", and was translated into English by Anis Shorrosh, who calls it "a tool to liberate Muslims", and who believes that Muhammad is "the antichrist". It contains 77 numbered chapters, plus a prologue and epilogue. According to Shorrosh, The True Furqan is an attempt to respond to the challenge in the Quran that none can create a work like it, and incorporates a Christian rather than Islamic message.

Christian apologist Nabeel Qureshi wrote "This book apparently reproduced the Quranic style so effectively that some who recited it aloud in public areas were thanked by Arab Muslims for having recited the Quran itself."

Christian missionary Dr. Ray Register characterized the book as an effective tool for "pre-evangelism" to help "critique the Quran and popular Muslim attitudes toward Jesus and ethical living."

It has been described as "Christian propaganda" since its second verse "starts talking about the Holy Trinity, a thoroughly un-Islamic concept." and The American Muslim called the book a "hoax", saying it represented "a desperate measure to find some way to convert the infidel Muslims since a few hundred years of concerted effort have brought so little success". Other critics called it "poor in quality and ridiculous in content" and "a pathetic attempt to distort the Quranic teaching by reproducing what looks like Quranic verses."

Islamic scholars at the University of Tehran have argued that The True Furqan uses a flawed methodology in its attempt to answer the challenge of the inimitability (Taḥaddi) of the Quran.

Michael R. Licona draws a parallel between The True Furqan and the Gospel of Barnabas, in that each attempts to emulate the style of the scriptures of one religion in order to advance the doctrinal claims of the other, albeit with the respective roles of Christianity and Islam reversed.

Some Islamic believers feel The True Furqan was created by the American or Israeli governments as part of a conspiracy. The Egyptian newspaper Al-Usbū^{c} claimed in its December 6, 2004 edition that "The True Koran [sic] was drafted with direct Israeli participation and with direct instructions from U.S. President George Bush." The US State Department strongly rejects allegations of any US government participation in the creation of The True Furqan. According to the translator Anis Shorrosh, "there was no Israeli involvement in the preparation of the book."

== Censorship ==
The importation of the book into India is prohibited.
