= Carl F. Ellis Jr. =

American theological anthropologist and pastor

Carl F. Ellis Jr. (born 1946) is an American theological anthropologist who has been a pastor and faculty member at Westminster Seminary and Redeemer Seminary. He is Provost's Professor of Theology and Culture at Reformed Theological Seminary. He has authored books on African American theology and the church's global mission.

== Early life and education ==
Born in Brooklyn, NY, 1946, Ellis grew up in Gary Indiana and attended Hampton University in the late 1960s. He wanted to join the Air Force like his father, a WWII veteran and Tuskegee airman. But mix-ups with his draft papers made the government think he was dodging service. The ordeal connected with this incident ended his plans for military service.

Ellis holds a BA from Hampton University, a Master of Arts in religion from Westminster Theological Seminary, and a PhD from Omega Graduate School. Oxford Graduate School. He studied under Francis Schaeffer at L'Abri in Huemoz-sur-Ollon, Vaud, Switzerland.

== Career ==
In 1969, Ellis became Senior Campus Minister with Tom Skinner Associates in New York. From 1982 to 1984, he served as interim pastor of New City Fellowship in Chattanooga, TN. From 1984 to 1989, he served as Assistant Pastor of Forest Park Community Church in Baltimore. He was also a faculty member at Chesapeake Theological Seminary and seminar instructor for Prison Fellowship. From 1979 to 2009, Ellis was an adjunct instructor at the Center for Urban Theological Studies. From 2006 to 2009 he served as Dean of Intercultural Studies at Westminster Theological Seminary.

Ellis served as assistant professor of practical theology at Redeemer Seminary in Dallas, Texas, and is the associate pastor for cultural apologetics at New City Fellowship. In 2017, he was appointed Provost's Professor of Theology and Culture at Reformed Theological Seminary.

Ellis has authored several books promoting intercultural understanding and engagement within theological education. His work seeks to apply biblical theology to the concerns of different cultures, particularly minority groups.

== Personal life ==
Ellis married his first wife in 1974. They had two children and were married for seventeen years. In 2011, Ellis married a graduate of Westminster, Karen Bishop.

== Publications ==
- Ellis, C.F. (1995). Free at Last?: The Gospel in the African-American Experience. InterVarsity Press. ISBN 978-0-8308-1687-3.
- Ellis, C. (2005). Go Global: Beyond the Boundaries. UMI (Urban Ministries, Incorporated). ISBN 978-0-940955-94-3.
- Ellis, C.F. (1983). Beyond Liberation: The Gospel in the Black American Experience. InterVarsity Press. ISBN 978-0-87784-914-8.
- Poston, L.; Ellis, C.F. (2000). The Changing Face of Islam in America: Understanding and Reaching Your Muslim Neighbor. Horizon Books. ISBN 978-0-88965-168-5.
