= Master of Letters =

Master's degree

A Master of Letters degree (M.Litt. or Litt.M.; Latin Magister Litterarum or Litterarum Magister) is a postgraduate degree awarded across the Anglosphere, reflecting studies in one of the humanities, liberal arts, or an associated major.

== Ireland ==
Trinity College Dublin and Maynooth University offer M.Litt. degrees. Trinity has offered them the longest, owing largely to its tradition as Ireland's oldest university and Anglican heritage. MLitts are on offer from the School of Law and the School of Humanities.School of Law

The National University of Ireland offers M.Litt. degrees across the Human Sciences/Arts. Often students register initially for the M.Litt. programme before being 'promoted' to PhD studies. Different schools and institutes have different requirements for an M.Litt. — generally a number of seminars in the relevant area need to be completed as well as the substantial dissertation researched and written over the period of 4 semesters (6 part-time).

== United Kingdom ==
The Master of Letters degree is a postgraduate degree awarded by a few select British universities, predominantly within the "ancient" English and Scottish traditions.

=== England and Wales ===
Within the English and Welsh university systems, M.Litt. degrees are not offered at every institution, nor in every discipline. An M.Litt. may be awarded as an alternative to the Master of Philosophy (M.Ph. / Ph.M.) research degree and is usually placed higher in the hierarchy; starting with degrees such as the postgraduate Master of Arts (M.A.) and Master of Science (M.Sc.), then Master of Philosophy, and finally Master of Letters. Note that this varies from the position in Scotland. Students attending English universities do not apply for an M.Litt., rather, for those who have completed two years of a doctorate (such as a Ph.D.) and who do not wish to, or cannot, continue with the final year(s), the M.Litt. degree exists to compensate and reflect the research that candidate has conducted up to that point in time, the draft of which serves as their terminal thesis.

=== Scotland ===
The M.Litt. is awarded within most Scottish universities in reflection of the merit of having completed a one-year, non-research-focused postgraduate course, or a two-year, research-focused postgraduate course. In Scotland, M.Litt. degrees are not awareded as a sub-PhD compensatory alternative as is done in the English model. This designation also distinguishes postgraduate degrees from the award of the undergraduate degree of Master of Arts by the ancient universities of Scotland (St. Andrews, Aberdeen, Glasgow, Edinburgh). Postgraduate study for both taught and research degrees at this level may be undertaken on campus or by distance learning, depending on the university. For example, the University of the Highlands and Islands and the University of Aberdeen both offer full M.Litt. courses taught through distance learning.

The taught M.Litt. requires study of 90 ECTS credits, including a research-led dissertation (often 30 credits) usually of 15,000-18,000 words in length. The M.Litt. (Research) may be awarded to a student whose postgraduate course of special study and research represents a significant contribution to knowledge. The period of full-time study is two years and the thesis is normally 40,000–50,000 words — sometimes up to 70,000. In all cases, the M.Litt. is usually awarded in Arts, Divinity, Fine Art, Humanities, or Social Sciences.

=== at the University of Edinburgh ===
The University of Edinburgh does not designate degrees as M.Litt., normally offering the degree of M.Sc. for a one-year taught postgraduate degree. It offers research degrees as either a one-year Masters by Research, a two-year Master of Philosophy, or a Ph.D.

== United States ==
Most American universities do not award the Master of Letters degree. It is awarded by some schools in the United States.

- Drew University, in Madison, New Jersey, offers the Master of Letters as an interdisciplinary graduate degree in the Humanities through its "Arts & Letters" programme. The M.Litt. degree requires 33 credit hours and the option of submitting a three-credit 50 to 75-page thesis. It is an intermediate degree in the programme, which also offers a Doctor of Letters (D.Litt.) program.
- Middlebury College offers the degree for the advanced study of English and writing beyond the Master of Arts through its Bread Loaf School of English.
- Mary Baldwin University awards a M.Litt. degree requiring two years of study and research in Shakespeare and Performance, which it offers as an intermediate degree in its three-year MFA program.
- Omega Graduate School in Tennessee offers an M.Litt. degree in Family Life Education and Organizational Leadership.

== Australia ==
The M.Litt. is awarded by two universities in Australia:

- Central Queensland University offer the degree only by distance education through the School of Humanities, Psychology and Social Work, as a 50% coursework, 50% research course, taking two to three years part-time.
- The University of Sydney's M.Litt. is available to students who have previously completed an MA in a relevant discipline. Students can specialise in Creative Writing, English, Theology, History, Linguistics, Museum Studies, or Peace and Conflict Studies.

The Australian National University, Monash University and the University of New England once offered the M.Litt., but have both discontinued the course. Monash, however, retained the Bachelor of Letters as a postgraduate arts degree.
