= Lists of universities and colleges by country =

This is a list of lists of universities and colleges by country, sorted by continent and region. The lists represent educational institutions throughout the world which provide higher education in tertiary, quaternary, and post-secondary education.

== Africa ==
- Algeria
- Angola
- Benin
- Botswana
- Burkina Faso
- Burundi
- Cameroon
- Cape Verde
- Central African Republic
- Chad
- Comoros
- Congo
- Democratic Republic of the Congo
- Djibouti
- Egypt
- Eritrea
- Ethiopia
- Equatorial Guinea
- Eswatini
- Gabon
- The Gambia
- Ghana
- Guinea
- Guinea-Bissau
- Ivory Coast
- Kenya
- Lesotho
- Liberia
- Libya
- Madagascar
- Malawi
- Mali
- Mauritania
- Mauritius
- Morocco
- Mozambique
- Namibia
- Niger
- Nigeria
- Rwanda
- São Tomé and Príncipe
- Senegal
- Seychelles
- Sierra Leone
- Somalia
- Somaliland
- South Sudan
- Sudan
- South Africa
- Tanzania
- Togo
- Tunisia
- Uganda
- Zambia
- Zimbabwe

== Americas ==
- Antigua and Barbuda
- Argentina
- Bahamas
- Barbados
- Belize
- Bolivia
- Brazil
- Canada
- Cayman Islands
- Chile
- Colombia
- Costa Rica
- Cuba
- Dominica
- Dominican Republic
- Ecuador
- El Salvador
- Grenada
- Guatemala
- Guyana
- Haiti
- Honduras
- Jamaica
- Mexico
- Nicaragua
- Panama
- Paraguay
- Peru
- Saint Kitts and Nevis
- Saint Vincent and the Grenadines
- Suriname
- Trinidad and Tobago
- United States
- Uruguay
- Venezuela

== Asia ==
- Afghanistan
- Armenia
- Azerbaijan
- Bahrain
- Bangladesh
- Bhutan
- Brunei
- Cambodia
- China (mainland)
- Cyprus
- East Timor
- Hong Kong
- Georgia
- India
- Indonesia
- Iran
- Iraq
- Israel
- Japan
- Jordan
- Kazakhstan
- Kuwait
- Kyrgyzstan
- Laos
- Lebanon
- Malaysia
- Macau
- Mongolia
- Myanmar
- Nepal
- North Korea
- Oman
- Pakistan
- Palestine
- Philippines
- Qatar
- Saudi Arabia
- Singapore
- South Korea
- Sri Lanka
- Syria
- Taiwan
- Tajikistan
- Thailand
- Turkey
- Turkmenistan
- United Arab Emirates
- Uzbekistan
- Vietnam
- Yemen

== Europe ==
- Albania
- Andorra
- Austria
- Belarus
- Belgium
- Bosnia and Herzegovina
- Bulgaria
- Croatia
- Czech Republic
- Denmark
  - Faroe Islands
  - Greenland
- Estonia
- Finland
- France
- Germany
- Gibraltar
- Greece
- Hungary
- Iceland
- Ireland
- Italy
- Kosovo
- Latvia
- Liechtenstein
- Lithuania
- Luxembourg
- Malta
- Moldova
- Monaco
- Montenegro
- Netherlands
- North Macedonia
- Norway
- Poland
- Portugal
- Romania
- Russia
- San Marino
- Serbia
- Slovakia
- Slovenia
- Spain
- Sweden
- Switzerland
- Ukraine
- United Kingdom: Universities; Colleges offering HE courses
  - England
  - Northern Ireland
  - Scotland
  - Wales
- Vatican City

== Oceania ==
- Australia
- Melanesia
  - Fiji
  - Solomon Islands
  - Vanuatu
- New Zealand
- Palau
- Papua New Guinea
- Polynesia
  - Cook Islands
  - French Polynesia
  - Nauru
  - Niue
  - Samoa
  - Tokelau
  - Tonga
  - Tuvalu
  - Wallis and Futuna

== See also ==
- List of education articles by country
- List of for-profit universities and colleges
- List of largest universities and university networks by enrollment
- Lists of universities and colleges
