= List of universities in Lesotho =

This is a list of notable universities in Lesotho.

- Botho University
- Lerotholi Polytechnic
- Limkokwing University of Creative Technology
- National University of Lesotho

== See also ==
- Education in Lesotho
- List of schools in Lesotho
