= List of universities in Vanuatu =

This is a list of universities in Vanuatu.

== Universities ==
- Vanuatu College of Nursing Education
- Talua Theological Training Institute
- University of the South Pacific (Vanuatu Emalus campus)
- Vanuatu Agriculture College
- Vanuatu Institute of Teacher Education
- Vanuatu Institute of Technology
- Vanuatu Maritime College
- National University of Vanuatu
- Harris University

== See also ==
- List of universities by country
