= List of universities in Sint Eustatius =

As of 2019, there are no universities in Sint Eustatius.

== See also ==
- List of universities by country
