= List of universities in Saint Vincent and the Grenadines =

This is a list of universities in Saint Vincent and the Grenadines.

== Universities ==
- American University of St. Vincent
- Richmond Gabriel University
- Saint James School of Medicine
- Saint Teresa University
- St. Vincent and the Grenadines Community College
- Trinity Medical Sciences University
- University College of The Caribbean - Saint Vincent Campus
- University of the West Indies, Open Campus

== See also ==
- List of universities by country
