= List of universities in Melanesia =

This is a list of universities and other higher education institutions in Melanesia.

== Regional ==
- University of the South Pacific, Emalus (Port Vila, Vanuatu) and Laucala (Suva, Fiji)

== Fiji ==

- Fiji College of Advanced Education
- Fiji College of Agriculture
- Fiji Institute of Technology
- Fiji National University
- Fiji School of Medicine, Suva
- Fiji School of Nursing
- Fulton Adventist University College, Sabeto
- Lautoka Teachers College
- Pacific Flying School
- South Pacific Bible College
- University of Fiji, Saweni
- University of the South Pacific, Suva

== New Caledonia ==
- South Pacific School of Management and Business (EGC), Noumea
- Institute of Economic and Accounting Techniques (INTEC), CNAM, Noumea
- Technical Institute for the Sea (INTECHMER), CNAM, Noumea
- New Caledonia Institute of Labour Relations (IRS), Noumea
- New Caledonia Graduate School of Banking (ESB), Noumea
- University of New Caledonia, Nouméa

== Papua New Guinea ==

- Divine Word University, Madang
- Pacific Adventist University, Boroko
- PNG University of Technology, Lae
- University of Goroka, Goroka
- University of Papua New Guinea, Port Moresby
- IBS University, Port Moresby
- University of Natural Resources and Environment, Vudal
- Christian Leadership Training College, Banz
- Port Moresby Business College, Port Moresby

== Solomon Islands ==

- Solomon Islands National University, Honiara
- University of the South Pacific, Honiara
- Atoifi College of Nursing, Malaita

== Vanuatu ==

- National University of Vanuatu
- Matevulu College
- Port Vila School of Nursing
- Revans University
- Tagabe Agricultural School
- Talua Ministry Training Centre
- University of the South Pacific - Vanuatu campus
- Vanuatu Agriculture College
- Vanuatu Institute of Teacher Education
- Vanuatu Institute of Technology
- Vanuatu Maritime College

== Rankings of universities ==
2008 Ranking Web of World Universities

Currently the Webometrics Ranking is the only that covers Melanesian universities. Most of them are provided in the Oceania section but Indonesian ones are provided under the Asia entry.

2006 Shanghai Jiao Tong University's academic ranking of world universities

As yet, no Melanesian universities appear in the Academic Ranking of World Universities produced by Shanghai Jiao Tong University's Institute of Higher Education.

2006 Times Higher Education Supplement Melanesian Rankings

Two universities were ranked in the Times Higher Education Supplement, both from Indonesia:

- Airlangga University
- Bandung Institute of Technology

Asiaweek's Melanesian top ranking universities

In 2000, Asiaweek ranked Asia's universities and grouped them according to whether they were a generalist multi-disciplinary or a science and technology university.

Multi-disciplinary
Rank	University
75	Airlangga University
73	Diponegoro University
68	Gadjah Mada University
61	University of Indonesia

Science and technology
Rank	University
21	Bandung Institute of Technology

In 1999, Asiaweek released the first regional listing of Asia's best universities. Melanesian universities in the list and their rankings were:

Rank	University
67	Gadjah Mada University
70	University of Indonesia
77	Diponegoro University
79	Airlangga University

== See also ==
- List of colleges and universities
- List of colleges and universities by country
