= List of universities in Burkina Faso =

This is a list of universities in Burkina Faso.

== Public universities ==
- Thomas Sankara University, Ouagadougou
- University of Koudougou, Koudougou
- University of Ouagadougou, Ouagadougou
- Nazi Boni University, Bobo-Dioulasso
- International Institute for Water and Environmental Engineering, Ouagadougou
- Institut Supérieur d’Informatique et de Gestion, Ouagadougou
- National School of Administration and Judiciary, Ouagadougou

== Private universities ==
- Burkina Institute of Technology, Koudougou
- Saint Thomas Aquinas University in Ouagadougou
- L'Université Aube Nouvelle, Ouagadougou
- L'Université du Faso, Ziniaré
