= Lerotholi Polytechnic =

- Established: 1905; 121 years ago
- Location: Maseru, Lesotho; 29.306431°S 27.485251°E

Lerotholi Polytechnic is a technical and vocational school in Maseru, Lesotho.

== History and operations ==
Lerotholi Polytechnic (LP) is an autonomous public institution that was established in 1905. It is governed by the Lerotholi Polytechnic Act of 1997 and offers both Crafts and Technician programmes.

The institution comprises four schools, namely, the School of Engineering and Technology (SET), and the School of the Built Environment (SOBE), which offers certificates in craft programs and diplomas in engineering. The School of Enterprise and Management (SEM) offers certificates in Textiles and diplomas in commercial programmes. The School of Continuing Education (SOCE) focuses on increasing access to education by offering specific need-based programs and courses to industry and the general public while also using available opportunities to generate income for the institution.

Chief Lerotholi first conceptualized Lerotholi Polytechnic, as a technical and vocational school in 1894, to be the first of its kind in Lesotho. In 1905, the first building was erected and various courses in trades were introduced. New skills and trades were added to the curriculum in 1929.

In 1960, the school changed to an artisan-oriented institution. Two new schools were established in the 1970s and 1980s, the Commercial Training Institute and the Technician Training School. In 1991, the three schools were merged. This amalgamation came to be known as Lerotholi Polytechnic (LP).

In an effort to respond to the global trends of liberalization, the government of Lesotho relinquished its responsibility over the institution and granted it autonomy through the LP Act, No. 20 of 1997 – a move intended to afford the institution the leverage to decide its own strategic direction.

== Controversy ==
Since 2009, Lerotholi Polytechnic has received significant negative attention for the abusive hazing rituals allegedly targeted at first year students. The school was forced to cancel its graduation ceremony during the same year after a student was beaten to death by former students. At least six students have reportedly died as a direct result of the school's “initiation” traditions.

== See also ==
- Education in Lesotho
- List of universities in Lesotho
