= List of universities in Nauru =

This is a list of universities in Nauru.

== Universities ==
- University of the South Pacific (Nauru campus)

== See also ==
- List of universities by country
