= LKC =

LKC may refer to:

- Lady Keane College, a women's College in Shillong, Meghalaya
- Lao-Korean College, a private college in Vientiane
- lkc, the ISO 639-3 code for Kucong language
