= Education in Brunei =

Ministry of Education
- Minister of Education: Romaizah Mohd Salleh

National education budget (2018)
- Budget: ▲B$696 million

General details
- Primary languages: English, Malay
- System type: National

Education in Brunei is provided or regulated by the Government of Brunei through the Ministry of Education (Kementerian Pendidikan) and the Ministry of Religious Affairs (Kementerian Hal Ehwal Ugama). The former manages most of the government and private schools in the country where as the latter specifically administers government schools which provide the ugama or Islamic religious education.

Formal education comprises compulsory, post-secondary and higher education. Compulsory education may be of two types: general education which takes twelve years and consists of pre-school, primary and secondary; and Islamic religious primary education which lasts seven years and is compulsory for Muslim pupils in Brunei. General education may be attained in government or private schools, where as religious education is attained in government religious schools.

Post-secondary education may consist of sixth form, which is an extension of secondary and allows direct entrance to higher education; and technical and vocational education which are provided in government institutions and private colleges. Higher education from bachelor's degree is provided in four government universities. Schooling for compulsory education is fully subsidised by the government for the citizens of Brunei and it usually extends to post-secondary and university.

Although Malay is the official language of Brunei, English is the main medium of instruction in most primary and secondary schools as well as colleges and universities. Nevertheless, Malay is the medium of instruction for Malay- and Brunei-related subjects, as well as in religious primary schools. The latter also adopts Jawi alphabet, a Perso-Arabic script, instead of Roman alphabet. Arabic is used in Arabic religious schools and Islamic universities. Chinese may be used as a medium of instruction or as a subject in Chinese private schools.

As of 2019, the Ministry of Education administered or oversaw 232 schools in the preschool, primary and secondary levels, 12 technical and vocational institutions, and 7 universities and other tertiary-level institutions. They employed 10,942 teachers, out of which 72.9% were female. A total of 107,166 students were enrolled, whereby 49.9% were female. In the same year, the Ministry of Religious Affairs administered 158 Islamic religious schools, employing 2,205 teachers and enrolling 36,926 students.

== History ==
In Brunei, the first school was founded in 1914. Since then, there has been a substantial expansion in the availability of education in the nation. The complexity of the country's educational system has likewise increased. Following the country's 1984 independence from the United Kingdom, numerous new efforts were launched with the goal of enhancing national identity and advancing human resources. But the system did not come to realize its current organizational structure and curriculum coherence until 2007 with the launch of Wawasan Brunei 2035, a national vision for the nation, and the approval of Sistem Pendidikan Negara Abad ke-21 (SPN21), an objective for the national education system for the 21st century.

== School grades ==
Overview of school grades in Brunei
General		Religious	Arabic		Typical age
Pre-school					5–6
Primary	Year 1				6–7
Primary	Year 2	Pre-school			7–8
Primary	Year 3	Primary I			8–9
Primary	Year 4	Primary II			9–10
Primary	Year 5	Primary III	Preparatory	Preparatory 1	10–11
Primary	Year 6	Primary IV	Preparatory	Preparatory 2	11–12
Secondary	Year 7	Primary V	Secondary	Year 7	12–13
Secondary	Year 8	Primary VI	Secondary	Year 8	13–14
Secondary	Year 9		Secondary	Year 9	14–15
Secondary	Year 10		Secondary	Year 10	15–16
Secondary	Year 11		Secondary	Year 11	16–17
Sixth form	Year 12 (Lower Six)		Sixth form	Year 12 (Lower Six)	17–18
Sixth form	Year 13 (Upper Six)		Sixth form	Year 13 (Upper Six)	18–19

== General education ==
=== Preschool ===
Children's education in Brunei may start from kindergartens. They are optional prior to the preschool of compulsory education and only available in non-government schools.

Compulsory education begins with a one-year preschool (commonly known as pra), expected at the age of 5.

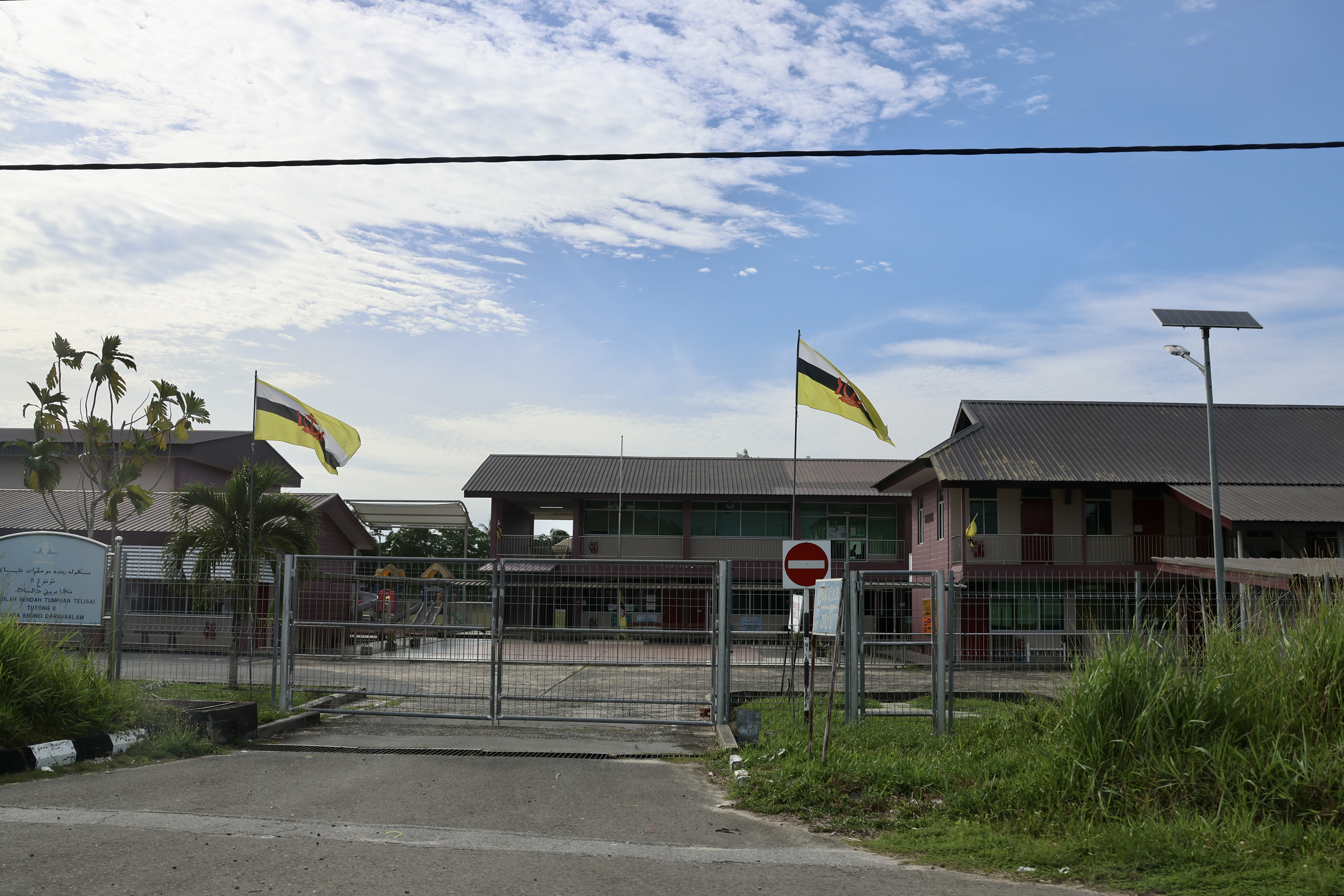
Tumpuan Telisai Primary School

=== Primary ===
Primary education (pendidikan rendah) follows preschool and lasts for six years, beginning from Year 1 (Tahun 1) until Year 6 (Tahun 6). Prior to the current education system Sistem Pendidikan Negara Abad ke-21, the primary years were formerly known by the name 'Primary' ('Darjah') and adopt Roman numerals, e.g. 'Primary IV'. Primary education ends with the national examination Penilaian Sekolah Rendah ("Primary School Assessment", commonly known as PSR).

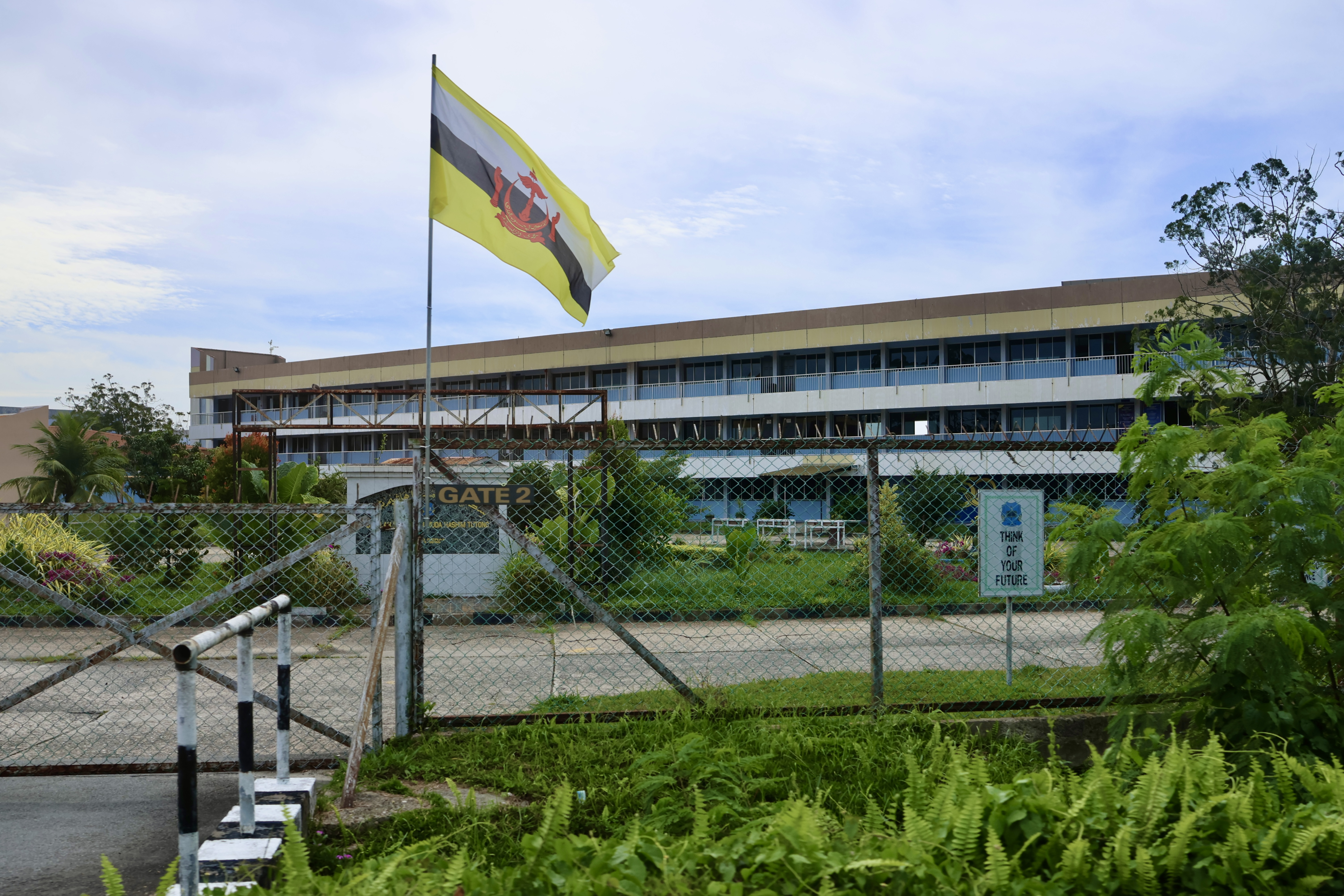
Muda Hashim Secondary School

=== Secondary ===
Secondary education (pendidikan menengah) is compulsory and generally lasts for five years, beginning from Year 7 until Year 11. Year 7 and 8 constitutes Lower Secondary and culminates with the Student Progress Assessment (SPA). Year 9 until Year 11 constitutes Upper Secondary and ends with national examination Brunei-Cambridge GCE Ordinary Level ('O' Level).

Prior to SPN21, Lower Secondary constituted three years and began with Form I (one) until Form III (three). The national examination was Penilaian Menengah Bawah ("Lower Secondary Assessment") which was taken at the end of Form III. Upper Secondary encompassed two years, Form IV (four) and Form V (five), and culminated in the sitting of 'O' Level examination as today.

Primary students who have achieved A's in all five subjects in PSR are eligible to study in 'science schools', a type of secondary school with emphasis on science-related curriculum. In normal secondary schools, students who have done well in Lower Secondary academics may also be put in 'science stream' classes which emphasise studying science-related subjects in greater breadth and depth, in particular studying Physics, Biology and Chemistry as separate subjects instead of under one subject 'Science'.

Students may opt for a shorter 2 years of Upper Secondary, subject to evaluation of academic records of Lower Secondary.

Bilingual Malay-English education for all students was established in 1985; prior to that year students would have one or the other as a medium, with students with better Primary Certificate of Education (PCE) scores getting English medium education.

=== Sixth form ===
If a student meets the requirements for the 'O' Level, they can continue on to a two-year pre-university program that prepares them for the GCE 'A' Level, the Brunei–Cambridge Advanced Level Certificate of Education. Students who complete pre-university education are better equipped to enroll in universities and other higher education programs both domestically and abroad. All pre-university students must study English Language at an appropriate level, such as the 'A/S' Level General Paper, Thinking Skills, English A.S., English Language and English Literature, or 'O' Level English, depending on their English Language 'O' Level grades. In accordance with permitted subject combinations, students may select three or more 'A' Level topics.

== Institute of Brunei Technical Education ==
With Sultan Hassanal Bolkiah's approval, the Institut Pendidikan Teknikal Brunei (IBTE) was founded on 27 May 2014, during the celebration of Isra' and Mi'raj. The Department of Technical Education's legislated duties will be replaced by IBTE, which will also be responsible for converting the current administrative structure into one based on the board of governance constitution. Restructuring the technical education system to make it more relevant and responsive to the demands of the nation is the motivation for the creation of IBTE. IBTE aims to support the government's goal of turning Brunei into a nation with highly trained and educated citizens who are also resilient and active economically, all of which contribute to a high standard of life that is consistent with Wawasan Brunei 2035.

== Islamic religious education ==
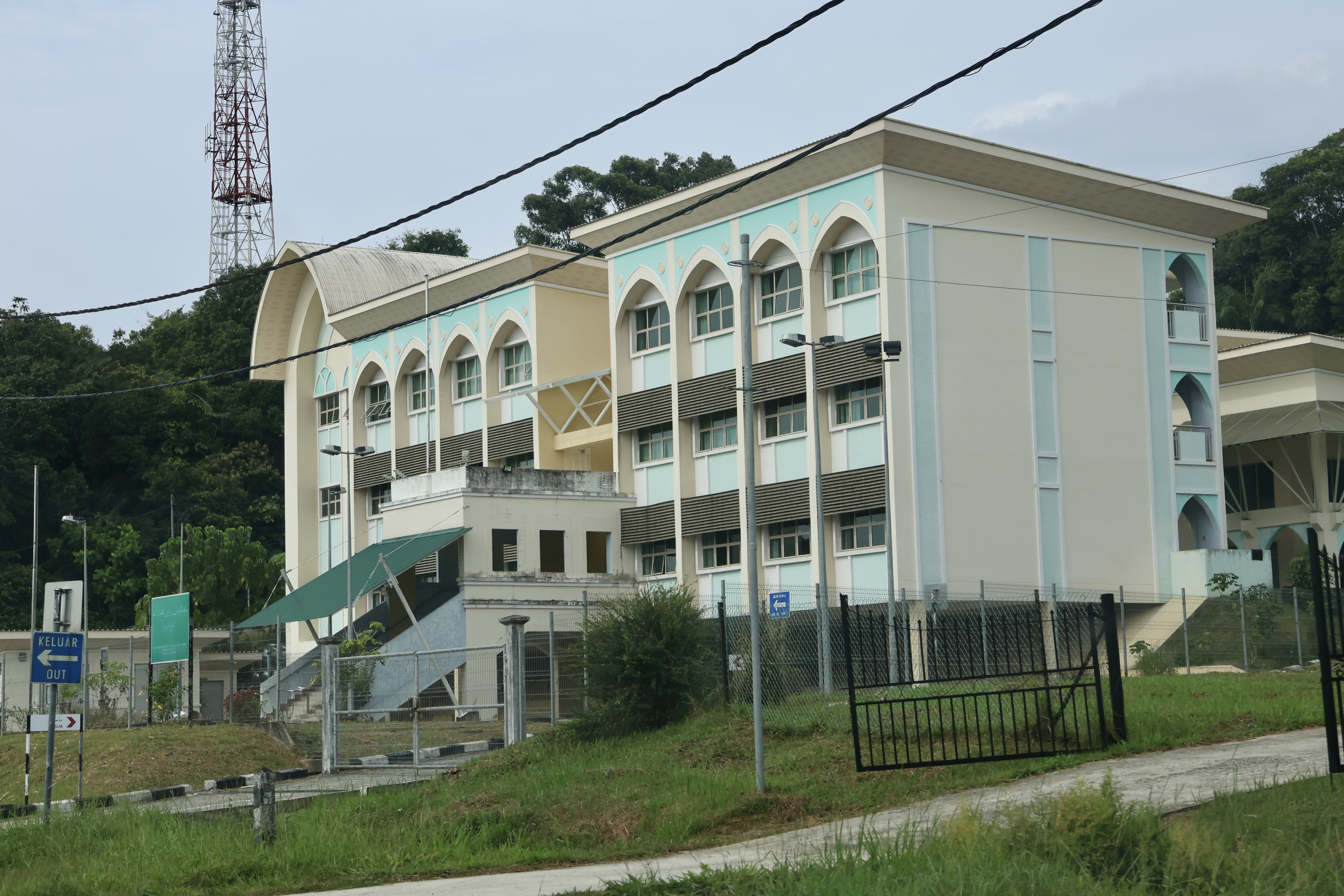
Fadzilah Lubabul Bolkiah Religious School

Formal Islamic religious education in Brunei is overseen by the Ministry of Religious Affairs and mainly comprises the religious primary education (rendah ugama) and the Arabic religious education (ugama Arab).

=== Religious primary ===
All Muslim children in Brunei between the ages of 7 and 15 must be enrolled in religious schools in accordance with the Compulsory Islamic Religious Education statute, which was enacted in 2012 and went into effect in January 2013. There are consequences for non-compliance. Enrollment numbers continued to be strong in spite of this regulation, with 5,036 students enrolled in 2013, 5,358 in 2014, and 5,102 in 2015. The little rise in enrolment that followed the law indicates that, rather than being a direct outcome of the legislation, the high numbers were probably caused by parents feeling obligated to give religious education.

An extensive range of Islamic themes were included in the religious school curricula from Primary 1 to Primary 6 in the 1950s. These included the following: Al-Quraan; Tauhid (Divinity); Ibadat (Obedience); Toharoh (Hygiene); Solat (Prayers); Zakat (Tithe); Puasa (Fasting); Hajj (Pilgrimage); Muamalat (Commerce); Munakahat (Marriage); Jinayat (Crime); Adab (Manners); Tarikh (History); Tajwid (Quraanic elocution); Faraid (Property and probate); Tasauf (Spiritual purity); Latihan Amali Ugama (Religious practice); and Dikir (Psalms).

As of January 2015, the Ugama school syllabus begins with pre-school, covering subjects like Al-Quraan, Amali, Tauhid, Adab, Jawi introduction, and Arabic language. In Primary 1, students learn Ibadat, Jawi writing, and reading. By Primary 2, Tarikh is introduced. In Primary 4, students study Toharoh, Siam (Fasting), Tasauf, and Dikir. Primary 5 introduces Solat, Zakat, Hajj, and Mu'amalat, while Primary 6 covers Munakahat, Janayah, Faraid, and Rawi (Narration).

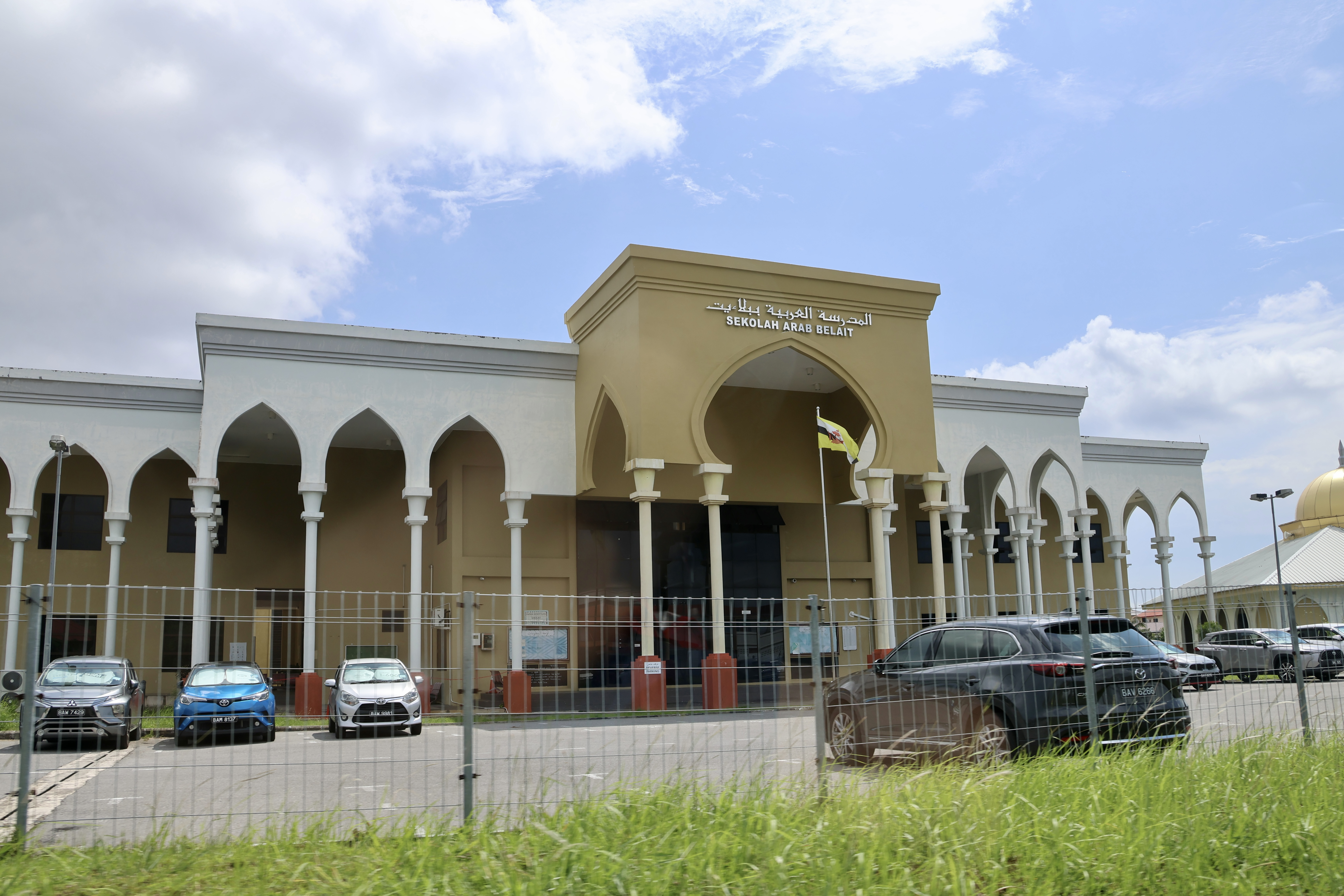
Belait Arabic School

=== Arabic religious ===
The Arabic Islamic religious education is a type of secondary education which specialises in subjects pertaining to Islamic religion. It is an alternative pathway for Muslim students in lieu of the general secondary education. The medium of instruction is Arabic. The culmination of this pathway allows students for entry into Islamic universities, local and abroad, in particular Al-Azhar University in Cairo, Egypt. The education in only provided in dedicated government schools.

Entry into the education is determined through a standardised entrance examination usually taken upon Year 4 of general primary education. The Arabic education begins with a 2-year Arabic preparatory (persediaan Arab), followed by a five-year secondary and a two-year sixth form. At the end of secondary, students sit for the standardised examination Sijil Pelajaran Ugama Brunei (SPUB, translates as "Brunei Religious Education Certificate"), whereas students sit for Sijil Tinggi Pelajaran Ugama Brunei (STPUB, translates as "Brunei Religious Education Higher Certificate") at the end of the sixth form.

The Arabic secondary schools may also provide general secondary education as an option which culminates in O and A Levels.

== See also ==
- List of universities in Brunei
