= List of universities in Tokelau =

Coordinates: 9.3733°S 171.2645°W

This is a list of universities in Tokelau.

== Universities ==
- University of the South Pacific (Tokelau campus)

== See also ==
- List of universities by country
