= List of universities in Wallis and Futuna =

This is a list of universities in Wallis and Futuna.

== Universities ==
- University de Wallis

== See also ==
- List of universities by country
