= Asmara (disambiguation) =

Asmara is the most populous city in the country of Eritrea.

Asmara may also refer to:

== Places ==
- University of Asmara, a public university in the city
- Asmara College of Health Sciences, a public college in the city
- Asmara International Airport, an airport serving the Asmara metropolitan area

== Films ==
- Asmara Moerni, an Indonesian romance film
- Asmara Songsang, a Malaysian anti-LGBT film
- Asmara (TV series), an Indonesian soap opera

== Other ==
- Asmara Brewery, an Eritrean brewery
  - Asmara Brewery FC, a football club operated by the brewery
