= Jack Botlhoko =

Jack Bohloko
- Born: Botswana
- Education: Limkokwing University of Creative Technology (did not complete)
- Occupations: Videographer; Music video director; Multimedia entrepreneur
- Known for: Music video production for Botswana and South African artists

Jack Bohloko is a self-taught Motswana videographer and music video director. He is known in the industry by the nickname Bra Nyoboka and has directed music videos for Botswana and South African artists.

== Early life and career ==
Bohloko has described his interest in cameras as coming partly from the absence of photographs of himself growing up, which led him to want to capture moments for others. He enrolled at Limkokwing University of Creative Technology in Botswana but left before finishing his studies to start his own multimedia business. He won the music video category at the President's Day celebrations competition three consecutive times.

== Career ==
Bohloko built his career through music video production for Botswana artists. Early work included the video for Amantle Brown's Black Mampatile. He directed several videos for Vee Mampeezy, including Dumalana, which has over 8 million YouTube views.

A significant step came when South African artist Master KG responded to a portfolio Bohloko had sent to around 30 South African musicians. Master KG visited Botswana with Makhadzi, and Bohloko directed their collaboration Tshinada, which has passed 10 million views on YouTube.

In 2020 he moved to Johannesburg, South Africa, stating that he had reached a comfort zone in Botswana and wanted new challenges. He stated that the move did not mean he was done with Botswana projects and spoke about a long-term goal of working with traditional Botswana artists.

== Recognition ==
In 2024 Bohloko received a nomination at the African Entertainment Awards USA (AEAUSA), an awards body formed in 2015 and based in the United States that recognizes African and Caribbean creative talent internationally.
