= List of universities in Togo =

This is a list of universities in Togo.

- Atlantic African Oriental Multicultural (ATAFOM) University International
- African Union University, Togo
- African University of science administration and commercial studies. IAEC UNIVERSITY TOGO
- American Institute of Commonwealth, Lomé, Togo(AIC)
- Maryam Abacha American University Niger, Togo Campus
- Centre de perfectionnement aux Technique Economique et Commerciales Université (CPTEC UNIVERSITÉ) Avepozo Lome, Togo
- IHERIS University, Togo
- Catholic University of West Africa
- American Institute of Africa - AIA
- Ecole supérieure de formation professionnelle (FIMAC)
- Université Bilingue Libre du Togo
- University of Kara
- University of Richard of Togo
- University of Lomé
- University of Science and Technology of Togo
- DEFOP University of Technology
- IRFODEL-Centre (University)
- Global Wealth University, Togo.
- Heritage International University

Institute

- ISTM University, Togo
- Wanam International, Togo
