= List of universities in Laos =

This is the list of universities and colleges in Laos.

- National University of Laos
- Souphanouvong University
- Champasak University
- Savannakhet University
- University of Health Sciences (UHS–Laos)
- Lao-Korean College
- Rattana Business Administration College (RBAC)

== Former ==
- Sisavangvong University
