= List of universities in the Cayman Islands =

This is a list of universities in the Cayman Islands:

- Cayman Islands Law School: A law school affiliated with the University of Liverpool in the U.K.
- International College of the Cayman Islands: A private university.
- St. Matthews University: A private institution containing a medical school and a veterinary school.
- University College of the Cayman Islands: The only public university in the Cayman Islands.
- University of the West Indies Open Campus: Affiliated with UWI Jamaica. https://www.open.uwi.edu/cayman_islands
