= List of universities in Botswana =

This is a list of universities in Botswana.

== Public universities ==
- Botswana Accountancy College
- Botswana University of Agriculture and Natural Resources
- Botswana International University of Science and Technology
- University of Botswana

== Private universities ==
- Botho University
- Limkokwing University of Creative Technology
- Botswana Open University (formerly BOCODOL), Online
- Ba Isago University
