= List of universities in Sierra Leone =

This is a list of universities in Sierra Leone.

== Universities in Sierra Leone ==
- University of Sierra Leone
  - College of Medicine and Allied Health Sciences
  - Eastern Polytechnic
  - Atlantic African Oriental Multicultural (ATAFOM) University
  - Fourah Bay College
- Njala University
- Ernest Bai Koroma University of Science and Technology
- Highwoods Institute
- University of Makeni
- University of Management and Technology, Sierra Leone

The University of Management and Technology is a private university located in Freetown, Sierra Leone. UNIMTECH educates undergraduate students nationwide. UNIMTECH as three schools: the school of public administration, school of social science, and school of technology, comprising more than 10 fields of study. UNIMTECH is scattered across the nation in Freetown, Bo, Kono, Lunsar, and Kambia.

- Dura Institute of Development and Management Studies (DIDAMS College)
