= List of universities in Grenada =

This is a list of universities in Grenada.

== Universities ==
- Business Support Centre
- Maurice Bishop English Institute
- St. George's University - 2 campuses
- T.A. Marryshow Community College - 4 campuses
- University of the West Indies - Grenada campus

== See also ==
- List of universities by country
