= List of universities in Djibouti =

This is a list of universities in Djibouti.

== Universities in Djibouti ==
- Université de Djibouti
- Atlantic African Oriental Multicultural (ATAFOM) University
