= List of universities in the Bahamas =

This is a list of universities in The Bahamas.

== Universities ==
- Bahamas Baptist Community College
- Bahamas Institute of Business & Technology
- Cherub College
- Eugene Dupuch Law School
- Institute Of Business & Commerce
- Omega College
- Southern College
- University of the Bahamas
- Galilee College

== See also ==
- List of universities by country
