= List of universities in Seychelles =

This is a list of universities in Seychelles.

== Universities in Seychelles ==
- Seychelles Polytechnic
- University of Seychelles
- Atlantic African Oriental Multicultural (ATAFOM) University
