= List of universities in Palau =

This is a list of universities in Palau.

== Universities ==
- Pacific Islands University (Palau campus)
- Palau Community College

== See also ==
- List of universities by country
