= List of schools in Lesotho =

This is a list of notable schools in the African country of Lesotho.

- Mabathoana High School
- Maseru Preparatory English Medium School
- Bocheletsane Primary School
- Makena High School (in Mafeteng)

== See also ==
- Education in Lesotho
