= Asmara College of Health Sciences =

Coordinates: 15.3426°N 38.9273°E

The Asmara College of Health Sciences is a public college in Asmara, Eritrea. It was founded in 1999 (27 years ago) as one of the faculties at the University of Asmara with the aim of creating competent health professionals to meet the health needs of the nation. The college acquired its present independent status in 2005.

The college has five major branches, namely: the School of Allied Health Professions, the School of Nursing, the School of Pharmacy, the School of Public Health, and the Department of Basic and Behavioral Sciences.

The college offers BSc degrees in nursing, public health, pharmacy, ophthalmology, midwifery, and clinical laboratory sciences. It also trains technicians to diploma level in pharmacy, dentistry, physiotheraphy, radiology, and laboratory research.

Since the college was founded, 3145 students have graduated, of whom 45% are female.

- In 2010, over 136 students graduated with degree or diploma.
- In 2013, 347 students graduated with degree or diploma, of whom 31% were female.
- In 2014, 477 students graduated with degree or diploma, of whom 34% were female.
- In 2015, 416 students graduated with degree or diploma, of whom 40% were female.
- In 2016, 367 students graduated with degree or diploma, of whom 40% were female.
- in 2018, 459 students graduated with degree or diploma.

In 2013, the number of the students was reported as increasing by more than 10% each year.

== See also ==
- List of universities in Eritrea
- Education in Eritrea
