= List of universities in the Central African Republic =

This is a list of universities in Central African Republic.

== Public Universities ==
- University of Bangui, Bangui

== Private Universities ==
- Euclid University, Bangui
- Atlantic African Oriental Multicultural University International (ATAFOM), Bangui
