= National University of Vanuatu =

Coordinates: 17.728°S 168.315°E

National University of Vanuatu (NUV): Université Nationale de Vanuatu: Nasonal Yunivesiti blong Vanuatu
- Established: 2019
- President: Mr. Jean-Pierre Nirua (from September 1, 2020)
- Students: c1000 in 2023
- Location: Port Vila, Vanuatu
Colors
White, green, red and yellow
- Website: www.univ.edu.vu/en/

National University of Vanuatu (NUV) was established by the Parliament on the 17th December 2019 via Act No. 34 of 2019 and opened in 2020.

The main campus, under development, is located in Port Vila and the university's purpose is to provide higher education advancement and lifelong learning through academic and professional excellence, The university offers teaching in both English and French, and research and international co-operation.

It incorporates the Vanuatu Institute of Teacher Education (VITE), Vanuatu Institute of Technology, Vanuatu Agriculture College, Vanuatu Maritime College, Vanuatu Nursing College, and Vanuatu Police College.

Former education minister and University of the South Pacific senior staff member, Jean Pierre Nirua, was appointed as the inaugural Vice-Chancellor for 5 years.

Alongside NUV, which is Vanuatu's first national university, the cross-Pacific University of the South Pacific continues to operate a campus in Port Vila.

== History ==
The history of the NUV project is documented in conference proceedings, The Pacific Way, 50 years on by Jean Pierre Niura and Anne-Sophie Vivier (2024).

== Structure ==
Management is through the Vice-Chancellor’s Office, a Council, and an academic Senate. Parts of the university are still under development.

- Faculty of Science and Technology consists of five schools, some still under development.
- School of Education/Ecole Supérieur du Professorat et de l'Education
- School of Agriculture (2026?)
- Faculty of Humanities, to incorporate a School of Vanuatu Arts, Languages and Cultures

There are research links to Institut de Recherche pour le Développement (IRD) and the Institut Pasteur, both in New Caledonia.

== Teaching ==
Modest registration fees are charged to students.

Degrees Taught (incomplete):

- Bachelor of Tourism and Hospitality
- Information and Communication Technologies (ICT) Diploma
- BA/Licence education (primary and secondary)

The first graduation ceremony was held on 16th May 2025.

== See also ==
- List of universities in Polynesia
