= List of universities in Eswatini =

This is a list of universities in Eswatini.

== Universities in Eswatini ==
- Limkokwing University of Creative Technology
- Southern African Nazarene University
- Eswatini Medical Christian University
- University of Eswatini
- Springfield Research University
