= National School of Administration and Judiciary =

National School of Administration and Judiciary (Burkina Faso) École nationale d'administration et de magistrature

Location
- Ouagadougou; Burkina Faso
- Coordinates: 12.3787°N 1.5061°W

Information
- Type: Professional institution
- Motto: "Bien former pour mieux servir!" ("Train well to serve better!")
- Established: December 4, 1959; 65 years ago
- Director: Jacob Yarassoula Yarabatioula
- Website: www.enam.gov.bf

The National School of Administration and Judiciary (ENAM), created on December 4, 1959, is a higher education institution for training administrative personnel in Burkina Faso, headquartered in Ouagadougou.

== History ==
=== Creation and context ===
Formerly called the National School of Administration (ENA), the current National School of Administration and Judiciary (ENAM) was established by presidential decree on December 4, 1959, at the dawn of the independence of Upper Volta, which became Burkina Faso in August 1984. The opening of this training school for administrative agents marked the political will of the country's authorities to establish a specialized school to support the efforts of setting up the new national administration. From January 1960, the ENA began to operate and received its first trainees for six months of training to replace colonial personnel. At that time, the school focused on urgent needs with personnel from fields such as general administration, rural economy and cooperation, justice, and police, financial legislation, and accounting.

=== Evolution ===
From October 1966, its general mission became the training and improvement of various personnel at all levels and applied research for development. It also acquired the status of a public administrative institution (EPA) with legal personality and financial autonomy.

Since 1968, the school has occupied its current premises in Ouagadougou next to the Joseph Ki-Zerbo University. Depending on institutional changes, administrative supervision has been exercised by the presidency, the Prime Minister, and finally the Ministry of Public Service. These successive changes in the supervisory institution aimed to allow close monitoring of its activities.

=== Name change ===
In 1984, the school opened a section for auditors of justice and adopted its current name, the National School of Administration and Judiciary (ENAM). ENAM is under the technical supervision of the Ministry of Public Service and the financial supervision of the Ministry of Finance.

Since its creation in 1959, the National School of Administration and Judiciary (ENAM) has always positioned itself as a leading institution in the professional training of state personnel. Indeed, the various reforms the institution has undergone have always advocated for the consolidation of its primary role in training state agents and later local government personnel, as well as the diversification of its missions. ENAM's institutional evolution has been marked by the modernization efforts initiated in the 2000s (2011-2020 Strategic Decade Plan for the Modernization of Administration), materialized in 2011 with the adoption of the first strategic plan of TENAM (2011–2016). Following this first plan, a second was adopted in 2017 (2017–2021). These two strategic plans significantly changed ENAM's trajectory, expanding its actions in the field of vocational training.

== Main missions ==
Currently, ENAM's missions are threefold:

- The initial and continuing vocational training of state agents, local governments, public and semi-public institutions;
- Conducting applied research in public administration;
- Providing advisory assistance to state administrations, local governments, public and semi-public institutions.

These contemporary missions of ENAM stem from the strategic planning of 2011-2016 and 2017–2021. These two important moments in the structure's development have seen varied results with many achievements but also many shortcomings. However, ENAM has long been the flagship of professional education in Burkina Faso.

== Training programs by department ==
=== General Administration ===
- General Administration
- Secretariat
- Human Resource Management
- Archives
- Information and Documentation Management

=== Socio-Economic Services Management ===
- School and University Administration
- School and University Intendance
- Economics and Finance
- School and University Administration

=== Judiciary and Registry ===
- Judiciary
- Court clerk and Prosecutor's Office
- Human Rights
- Judicial Interpreters

=== Employment, Vocational Training, and Social Law Management ===
- Employment and Vocational Training
- Labor Administration and Social Laws

=== Tourism and Cultural Services Management ===
- Cultural Administration
- Tourism
- Cinema and Audiovisual
- Museology

== Directors ==
- 1959–1973: Lompolo Koné
- 1965–1967: Malick Zoromé
- 1973–1980: Ignace Kalmogo
- 1980–1982: Laurent Kilachiu Bado
- 1982–1983: Ambroise Zagre
- 1984–1986: Pascal Témai Benon
- 1983–1984: Laurent Kilachiu Bado
- 1986–1987: Jonas Hanitan Ye
- 1988–1994: Philippe Somé
- 1994–2001: Haridata Dakouré
- 2001–2012: Moctar Tall
- 2013–2018: Benoît Kambou
- 2018–2023: Awalou Ouedraogo
- 2023–present: Jacob Yarassoula Yarabatioula

== Notable alumni ==
- Roch Marc Christian Kaboré, President of Burkina Faso (2015–2022)
- Alain Thierry Ouattara, Minister of Sports and Leisure
- Séglaro Abel Somé, Minister of Civil Service, Labor, and Social Protection
