= L'Université du Faso =

University in Burkina Faso

L’Université du Faso is a private, for-profit university in Ziniaré, 50 km (31 mi) from Ouagadougou, the capital of Burkina Faso. It also has a campus in Ouagadougou.

== History ==
The university was established in 2015 (10 years ago), at a time when Burkina Faso's public universities were experiencing financial crises and student protests.

Its youth as an institution means that building works, degree completions, and faculty recruitment are still ongoing. It has received accreditation through the Ministère de l’Enseignement supérieur, de la Recherche scientifique et de l’Innovation.

== Teaching ==
Three year undergraduate degrees (Licence) are offered in English, Geography, History, Modern letters, Linguistics, Sociology, and education.

Two year master's degrees are available in Communications, Geography, History, Linguistics, Literature, Education, Sociology, and Translation and interpretation.

Three year doctorates are in Communications, Geography, History, Linguistics, Literature, Education, Sociology, and Translation and interpretation.

== Research ==
There is no information on staffing on the new university's website.

Departments are Département d’anglais, Département de lettres modernes, Département de linguistique, Département Communication, Département de Géographie, Département d’histoire, Département de sociologie, Département des sciences de l’éducation.
