= List of universities in Polynesia =

This is a list of universities and other higher education institutions in Polynesia.

== Regional ==
- University of the South Pacific has numerous campuses, as listed below

== American Samoa ==

- American Samoa Community College, Mapusaga

== Cook Islands ==

- Takamoa Theological College
- University of the South Pacific - Cook Islands campus

== French Polynesia ==

=== Universities ===
- University of French Polynesia, Puna'auia
- Catholic University of the West in the Pacific, Papeete

=== Graduate Schools ===
- Conservatoire National des Arts et Métiers de Polynésie Française, Punaauia
- ECT Business School, Papeete
- Cours Bufflier College, Papeete

== Nauru ==

- University of the South Pacific - Nauru campus

== New Zealand ==

=== Wānanga ===
(with principal campus only)

- Te Wānanga o Aotearoa (TWOA) (Te Awamutu)
- Te Wānanga-o-Raukawa (TWOR) (Ōtaki)
- Te Whare Wānanga o Awanuiārangi (Whakatane)

=== Institutes of Technology and Polytechnics ===
(with principal campus only)

- Ara Institute of Canterbury (Christchurch)
- Eastern Institute of Technology (EIT) (Taradale)
- Manukau Institute of Technology (MIT) (South Auckland)
- Nelson Marlborough Institute of Technology (NMIT) (Nelson)
- NorthTec, formerly Northland Polytechnic (Whangarei)
- Otago Polytechnic (Dunedin)
- Southern Institute of Technology (SIT) (Invercargill)
- Tai Poutini Polytechnic (Greymouth)
- The Open Polytechnic of New Zealand (Lower Hutt)
- Toi Ohomai Institute of Technology (Rotorua, Tauranga)
- UCOL (Universal College of Learning) (Palmerston North)
- Unitec Institute of Technology (Auckland)
- Waikato Institute of Technology (Wintec) (Hamilton)
- Wellington Institute of Technology (WelTec) (Petone and Lower Hutt)
- Western Institute of Technology at Taranaki (New Plymouth)
- Whitireia Community Polytechnic (WCP) (Porirua)

== Niue ==

- Lord Liverpool University - Niue campus
- Royal Academy of Fine Arts (Det Jyske Kunstakademi)
- St. Clements University
- University of the South Pacific - Niue campus

== Samoa ==

- National University of Samoa
- University of the South Pacific - Samoa Campus
- Oceania University of Medicine
- Piula Theological College
- Malua Theological College

== Tokelau ==

- University of the South Pacific - Tokelau campus

== Tonga ==

- University at ʻAtenisi Institute (founded by Futa Helu)
- Hango Agricultural College
- King's International University
- Tonga Institute of Science and Technology
- Tupou College
- University of the Nations - Tonga campus
- University of the South Pacific - Tonga campus
- Sia'atoutai Theological College
- Christ University in the Pacific (CUP)
- Tonga National University (TNU)

== Tuvalu ==
- University of the South Pacific - Tuvalu campus

== Wallis and Futuna ==
- University de Wallis

== See also ==
- List of colleges and universities
- List of colleges and universities by country
