= List of universities in Eritrea =

This is a list of universities in Eritrea.

== Universities ==
School	Location(s)	Control	Type	Established	Closed
University of Asmara	Asmara	Public	University	1958	2007

== Colleges ==
Note: currently there are no universities in Eritrea, the only university (University of Asmara) was closed in 2007 and its various colleges were re-established as independent institutions offering university level programs.

School	Location(s)	Control	Type	Established
College of Agriculture	Hamelmalo	Public	Specialized university	2005
College of Business and Social Sciences	Adi Keyh	Public	Specialized university	2006
College of Health Sciences	Asmara	Public	Specialized university	1999
College of Marine Sciences and Technology	Massawa	Public	Specialized university	2005
Eritrea Institute of Technology	Mai Nefhi	Public	Specialized university	2004
Orotta School of Medicine and Dentistry	Asmara	Public	Specialized university	2005
