= List of universities in Mali =

This is a list of notable universities in Mali.

- University of Bamako
- University of Sankoré
- University of Timbuktu
