= List of universities in Equatorial Guinea =

There are two institutions in Equatorial Guinea considered to be a university:

- National University of Equatorial Guinea
- Afro-American University of Central Africa

In addition, since 1981, the Spanish National University of Distance Education (UNED) has a campus in Guinea.
