= List of universities in São Tomé and Príncipe =

This is a list of universities in São Tomé and Príncipe.

- University of São Tomé and Príncipe
- Universidade Lusíada de São Tomé e Príncipe
