= List of universities in the Comoros =

This is a list of universities in the Comoros.

== Public Universities ==
- University of the Comoros, Moroni

== Private Universities ==
- Midocean University, Moroni
