= List of universities in Brunei =

This is a list of universities and colleges in the Brunei Darussalam. Full-fledged public and private universities and colleges are available across the country.

All public universities and colleges are given authorisation to award the students with their internal degree concentrations (qualifications) which are always accredited by the Brunei Darussalam National Accreditation Council (BDNAC).

The biggest awarding body in the country for both, public and private universities and colleges is Brunei Darussalam Technical and Vocational Education Council (BDTVEC).

== Government institutions ==
Name in English	Name in Malay	Abbreviation	Foundation
University of Brunei Darussalam	Universiti Brunei Darussalam	UBD	1985
University of Technology Brunei	Universiti Teknologi Brunei	UTB	1986
Sultan Sharif Ali Islamic University	Universiti Islam Sultan Sharif Ali	UNISSA	2007
Seri Begawan Religious Teachers University College	Kolej Universiti Perguruan Ugama Seri Begawan	KUPU SB	2007
Brunei Polytechnic	Politeknik Brunei	PB/BP	2012
Institute of Brunei Technical Education	Institut Pendidikan Teknik Brunei	IBTE	2014

Note: IBTE was formerly known as Department of Technical Education (DTE), headquarters to all the seven vocational and technical institutes in Brunei.

== Private institutions ==
Name in English	Name in Malay	Abbreviation	Foundation
Cosmopolitan College of Commerce and Technology	Kolej Perdangangan dan Teknologi Cosmopolitan	CCCT	2004
Kemuda Institute	Institut KEMUDA	KI	2004
Laksamana College of Business - Brunei campus of Kensington College of Business	Kolej Perdagangan Laksamana	LCB / KCB	2003
International Graduate Studies College	Kolej Pengajian Siswazah Antarabangsa	IGS	2002
Micronet International College	Kolej Antarabangsa Micronet	MIC	1989
Bicpa-Ftms Accountancy Academy	Akademi Perakaunan Bicpa-Ftms	BICPA	1987
HADtech College	Kolej HADtech	HADC	2019
