= University of the West Indies Global Campus =

University in Barbados

The University of the West Indies Global Campus
- Motto: Oriens Ex Occidente Lux (Latin)
- Motto in English: A Light Rising From The West
- Type: Regional, public, autonomous university
- Established: 1960
- Affiliations: Association of Commonwealth Universities (ACU); Caribbean Community; Association of Atlantic Universities
- Chancellor: Dr. the Most Hon. Dodridge Miller
- Vice-Chancellor: Sir Hilary Beckles
- Principal: Dr Francis Severin
- Location: Cave Hill, Barbados
- Campus: Online and regional campuses
Colors
- Website: global.uwi.edu

The University of the West Indies Global Campus (UWIGC) is a public and distance only, research university headquartered Cave Hill, Barbados. It is one of 5 general autonomous units of the University of the West Indies system. Its main campus is located inside the University of the West Indies at Cave Hill, but remains a distinct and separate institution.

Effective August 1, 2023, the Open Campus was re-branded as the Global Campus.

== History ==
The Open Campus was established to improve services to the non-campus territories. It brought together several existing UWI units, namely the University of the West Indies Distance Education Centre (UWIDEC), the School of Continuing Studies (originally the Extra Mural Department), the Tertiary Level Institutions Unit, and the Office of the Board for Non-Campus Countries & Distance Education (BNNCDE).

The Extra-Mural Department was first established in 1947 when UWI was still the University College of the West Indies. As it developed into the School of Continuing Studies, it eventually incorporated the Caribbean Child Development Centre, the Hugh Lawson Shearer Trade Union Education Institute, the Human Resources Development Unit, the Social Welfare Training Centre and the Women and Development Unit.

The University of the West Indies Distance Teaching Experiment (UWIDITE) was an initiative funded by a USD 600,000 grant from USAID. The telecommunications system was first used in St. Lucia, Dominica, Antigua and Grenada to provide access to courses in non-campus territories. At the same time, there was a Challenge Examinations scheme that allowed students to undertake initial (first year) studies in their home territories before joining one of the three campuses. The UWIDITE facilities were used to support the Challenge program. In 1996, UWIDEC, incorporating the UWIDITE and the Challenge Examinations scheme, was established. Further development of the UWIDEC was implemented in 2003.

In 2007, the Open Campus was approved. This Campus was provided with additional financial, human, technology and administrative resources and a structure that was intended to better serve non-campus territories. Aside from the main campus in Barbados, UWIOC maintains presence in 17 English-speaking countries and territories in the Caribbean: Anguilla, Antigua and Barbuda, The Bahamas, Barbados, Belize, Bermuda, British Virgin Islands, Cayman Islands, Dominica, Grenada, Jamaica, Montserrat, St. Kitts and Nevis, St. Lucia, St. Vincent and the Grenadines, Trinidad and Tobago, and Turks and Caicos Islands.

== Open Campus country sites ==
The Open Campus maintains physical sites in most contributing countries. The country sites conduct marketing and recruit new students, facilitate some face to face courses, provide spaces for studying, and some have UWI library branches.

- Anguilla - one site
- Antigua and Barbuda - one site
- Bahamas - one site
- Barbados - one site plus the Open Learning Centre at the Cave Hill Campus
- Belize - one site
- British Virgin Islands - one site
- Cayman Islands - one site
- Dominica - one site
- Grenada - one site
- Jamaica - 11 sites plus the Open Learning Centre at the Mona Campus
- Montserrat - one site
- Saint Lucia - one site
- St. Kitts and Nevis - one site
- St. Vincent and the Grenadines - one site
- Turks and Caicos - one site
- Trinidad and Tobago - 13 sites (sites, satellite centres, and IT Academy) plus the Open Learning Centre at the St. Augustine Campus

Bermuda does not currently have a Country Site.

== Academic programmes ==
The Open Campus offers a range of programmes in both distance and face-to-face modes at its regional learning centres. At the undergraduate level, the Open Campus offers programmes at the certificate, diploma, associate, and bachelor's levels in fields such as education, business and public administration, sports, technology, humanities, and social sciences. Similarly, at the graduate level, the Open Campus offers programmes at the advanced certificate, postgraduate diploma, master's, and doctoral levels in similar areas. The campus includes courses and certificates that are part of continuing and professional education, prior learning assessment, and summer school courses.

While the Open Campus is the main distance education unit of the University, some other units offer programmes by distance. For example, the UWI/FIFA/CIES Diploma in Sports Management is offered by distance and managed by UWI Mona. Similarly, the Department of Library and Information Studies offers several master's-level programmes in a blended learning format.

=== Accreditation ===
In 2019, UWI Open Campus was re-accredited by the Barbados Accreditation Council for the maximum term, ending in 2026. Subsequently, as the Open Campus operates across countries and territories, it sought mutual recognition in the contributing countries and territories.

== Research and development ==
The Open Campus, as with the landed UWI campus, has an active research and development environment. The main research unit is the Consortium for Social Development & Research (CSDR). It units several units that were already established before the Open Campus amalgamated several existing units. The units with a significant research mandate (along with educational development) include:

- Caribbean Child Development Centre (CCDC)
- Hugh Shearer Labour Studies Institute (HSLSI)
- Social Work Training and Research Centre (SWTRC)
- The Women and Development Unit (WAND)

Other units are more developmental in nature, in the sense of improving access to education and training:

- Human Resources Development Unit (HRDU)
- Radio Education Unit (REU)
- a yet-to-be-formed Cultural Studies Unit (CSU)

== See also ==
- University of the West Indies
- Distance education
