= Education in Lesotho =

Education in Lesotho has undergone reforms in recent years, meaning that primary education is now free, universal, and compulsory.

The Human Rights Measurement Initiative (HRMI) finds that Lesotho is fulfilling only 72.5% of what it should be fulfilling for the right to education based on the country's level of income. HRMI breaks down the right to education by looking at the rights to both primary education and secondary education. While taking into consideration Lesotho's income level, the nation is achieving 92.1% of what should be possible based on its resources (income) for primary education but only 52.8% for secondary education.

== Introduction ==
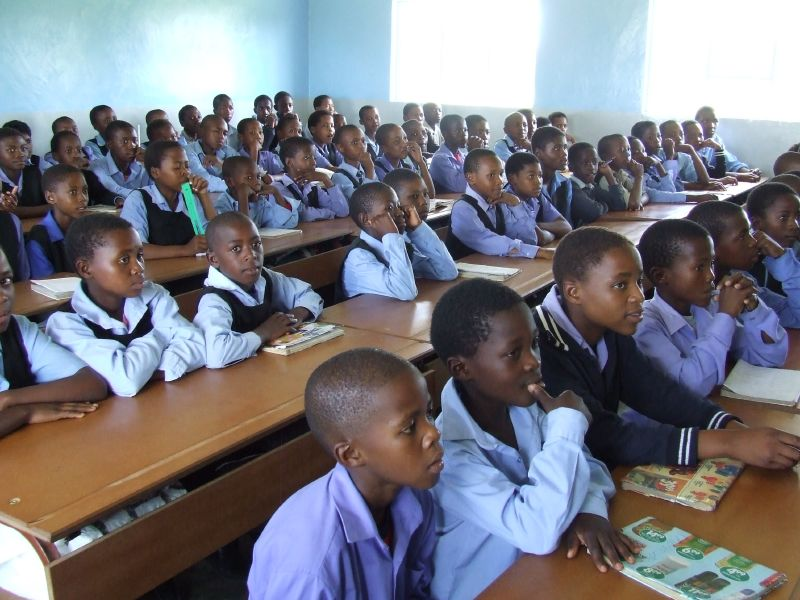
Classroom in Ha Nqabeni, Lesotho

Lesotho spends a higher proportion of its GDP (13%) on education than any other country in the world and an average child in Lesotho can expect to spend 10 years of their life in education. Education is compulsory only between the ages of 6 and 13. Secondary school education is non-compulsory, and as of 2005 was attended by 24.0% of 13- to 17-year-olds. There is a gender disparity present in secondary education, with more females attending than males. This disparity is greatest in wealthier areas, where males are 15.6% less likely than females to attend secondary school. Lesotho's educational system is organized in formal and informal domains. Lesotho contains a 3-7-3-2 formal education structure. Early childhood education is also known as pre-primary school in which students must pass 3 years before moving onto primary school. Primary school consists of seven grades (1-7) and upon completion receive the Primary School Leaving Examination (PSLE) certificate that allows students to move onto secondary schools. There are two divisions within the secondary school known as the lower and Upper secondary. Lower secondary runs for three years (8-10) and upon completion are given the Junior Certificate (JC) and move onto grades 11-12. Lesotho's formal system has about 2,204 pre-primary schools, 1,478 primary schools, roughly 341 post-primary schools and 14 higher education institutions. Lesotho's informal domains comprises 26 technical and vocational schools that offer individuals training in automotive mechanics, bricklaying and home sciences. The informal education is set in place to address the educational needs for those who are unable to attend education through formal means while also providing primary and secondary education. Secondary education covers five years, three year junior secondary and a two-year senior secondary. One must pass the nationally administered Junior Certificate Examination to continue, before culminating in the external examination of the Cambridge Overseas School Certificate (GCE "O" Level) that grants access to tertiary programs. Most university studies at the undergraduate level leading to a bachelor's degree takes four years to complete and masters programs typically take two years to complete.

== Education reforms ==
Free primary education began to be introduced to Lesotho in the year 2000. Before that, many boys received no primary education at all and spent their time herding animals. The adult literacy rate is higher for women (95%) than for men (83%). When free primary education was introduced, the government of Lesotho decided to phase it in gradually, with fee elimination beginning for the youngest children in the year 2000. In 2010, with primary school enrollment rates standing at 82%, an Education Act was introduced to make primary education not only free but also compulsory. While Lesotho does allocate over 23.3% of its budget on education, study in 2015 determined there were many challenges facing the educational sector. One such challenge includes poor retention rates at both primary and secondary levels. Other challenges included in the report are low student learning outcomes, high inefficiency in the system, and poor school governance. Many educational sectors also lack acceptable facilities and find it difficult to retain teachers, especially in mountainous districts or other areas where it is difficult to reach. As a result, Lesotho implemented the Educational Sector Strategic Plan for 2016-2026 to address these challenges. Lesotho's education plan for 2016–2026 is split into 13 chapters that cover an array of topics within the Ministry of Education and training. The plan not only serves as a blueprint for the Ministry's budget allocation for the decade but wants to focus on low performance in STEM subjects.

== Female education ==
While it is common for education to favor males, especially in low-income countries, the gender gap in education tends to favor women in Lesotho. The ratio in enrollment rates in secondary education are 1.6 females for every male, making it the highest in the world. Female education comes from the result of male out-migration to South Africa due to high unemployment and poverty. This caused women to outnumber men by four-to-one while most of the most who migrated stayed in South Africa. Despite the high enrollment rates of women, girls in lower education, drop out rates remain high attributed to cultural, economic and social factors.

== Challenges ==
While Lesotho's Ministry of Education and Training (MOET) introduced free primary education, many students with disabilities were excluded from education. In the 1990s, the ministry released their goals that would advocate for integrating people with disabilities. They include special education programs to help train teachers to particular set of students. With the passing of the Education Sector Strategic Plan in 2005, it targeted to significantly increase access for children with special educational needs (SEN) and promote more integration. There is still a shortage of qualified teachers in subjects such as science, math, business and technical topics.

== Universities ==
Lesotho has three universities. Its main university is the National University of Lesotho, located in Roma, which has around 10000 registered students. The capital, Maseru, has been home to a campus of Limkokwing University since 2008. Botho University in Maseru Mall, Ha Thetsane.
