= Lao-Korean College =

Coordinates: 17°59′35″N 102°31′40″E

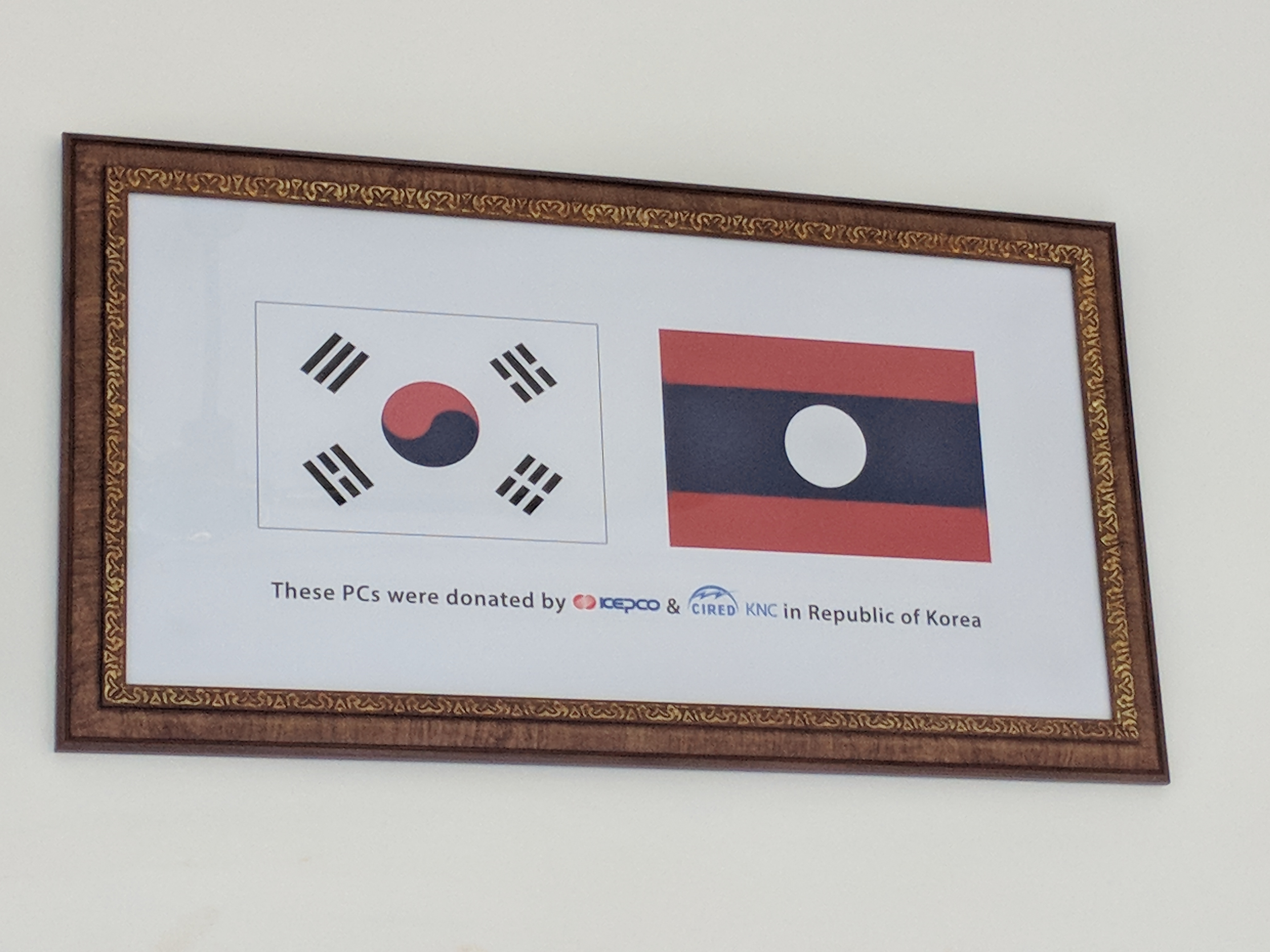
- Lao and Korean flags at the college in 2018
- Other name: LKC
- Type: private
- Established: 2006; 20 years ago
- Location: Vientiane, Vientiane Prefecture, Laos

Lao-Korean College (abbreviated as LKC) is a private college in Vientiane and was founded in 2006 on the basis of educating Lao students in the style of South Korea's education. The college has four Departments: Department of English, Department of Korean, Department of Accounting, and Department of IT. The college is supported by South Korea. The college mostly focuses on philosophy and cultivating future leaders of Lao society.

== History ==
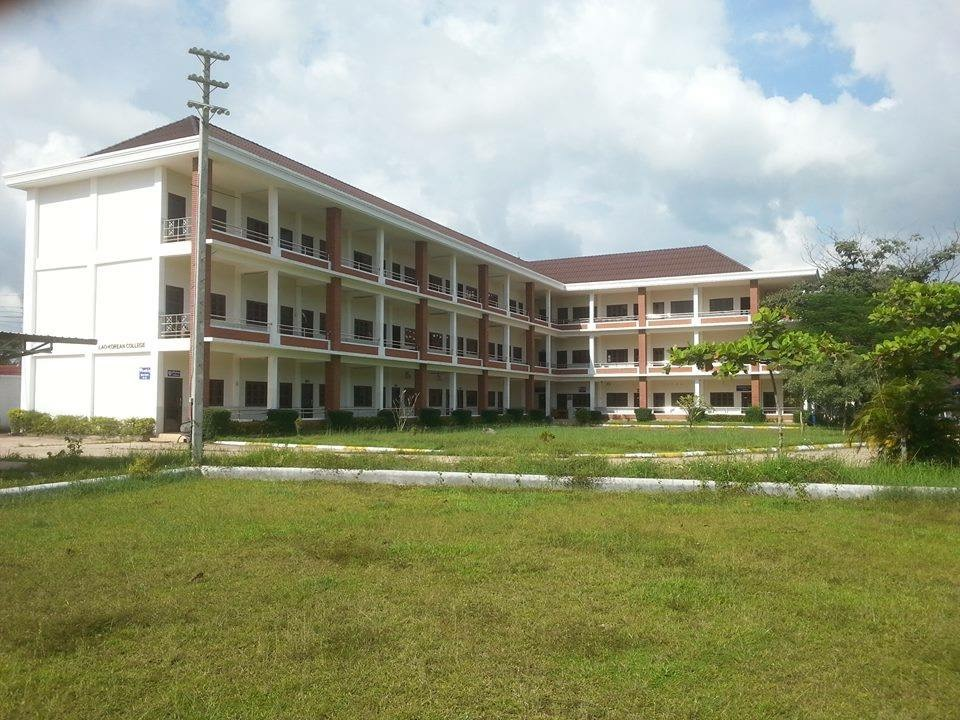
Building of LKC

Before its foundation, the college applied to the Ministry of Education in 2005, which was approved in 2006. 2006 would see the opening of the English department, and the inauguration of its first president Junghwan Lee. In 2009, 30 students became the first to graduate from the college. The Department of IT and Korean language was opened in 2010, while the Department of Accounting and Beauty opened in 2014.

The Southeast Asian Educational & Cultural Organization of South Korea would start supporting the college in 2016. In 2017, the college received financial support from South Koreans, including the president of the Chungsan Construction, Kim Sangyong. 2017 also saw the inauguration of the 2nd president of the college, Lee Jong Beom, and improved connections with South Korea. The college signed a memorandum of understanding with Daejeon and Honam University, and received donations of computer devices from South Korea. In 2018, it signed a memorandum of understanding with Keimyung University.

== Organization ==
The college operates four departements: English, Korean Language, Computer Science and Accounting. The Department of English teaches students the English language, and has Lao and American teachers. It also teaches students skills to do translation between Lao and English in tourism and business. The Department of Korean language teaches students Korean language and culture, and has Korean teachers. In addition to Korean culture, it teaches taekwondo. The Department of Computer Science educates students on computer and computer software to foster the IT industry in Laos. The department teaches students programming languages, graphic designs, data and web designs. The Department of Accounting teaches students on the financial system, announcing, and money and property management. The head of this department is also the vice-president of the college, Chansouk Kongkeo.

== Events ==
All students with majors in Korean language and graduating students with certain grades from other departments are given the chance to go on a free tour to South Korea in their third year, second semester. On 29 January 2018, the college held a Wikipedia workshop.
