= ATAFOM University International =

Atlantic African Oriental Multicultural University International known as ATAFOM University International, is a private University with headquarters in Bangui, Central African Republic (CAR). It has offices in Nigeria, Germany, India, America, England and other locations. The university uses the hybrid teaching model – online and physical classroom – for learning. Its headquarters is situated on 707 hectares (1,750 acres) of land in the capital city of the CAR.

== History ==
ATAFOM University was founded by its president, Şakir Yavuz, a Turkish National in 2019 (7 years ago). In 2021, the pilot academic session was launched with online instructions delivered in English language. Its language academy – ATAFOM Language Academy (ALA) – teaches non-English speaking students the English language before starting their academic programmes. It currently runs bachelor's degree programmes across four faculties, namely; Arts, Information Technology, Economics and Initial Public Offering.

The university runs internships and advanced training in IT and languages. Apart from learning the English language course as prerequisite for admission, the ATAFOM Language Academy offers English Language for students who are learning the language at advanced levels in line with the Common European Framework of Reference for Languages (CEFR) at levels A1, A2, B1, B2, C1 and C2. Through its hybrid teaching method – physical classroom and online learning methods – full-time, part-time and distance learning opportunities and options are made available. The university uses the European Credit Transfer and Accumulation System (ECTS) grading system to ensure standards for teaching and learning are adhered to.

Its main campus is in Bangui with training centres and information offices in England, Nigeria, USA, Germany, Russia, Türkiye, Ghana, UAE, Zambia and India. ATAFOM University International's mission is to deliver best quality education that offers equal opportunities to all. This is also captured in its slogan “Education for Integration”. ATAFOM University International is regulated by the Ministry of Education of the Central African Republic.
