= Limkokwing University of Creative Technology =

Private university in Malaysia

Coordinates: 2°56′24″N 101°39′45″E

- Universiti Teknologi Kreatif Limkokwing (Malay) 林国荣创意工艺大学 (Chinese)
- Former names: Limkokwing University College of Creative Technology (2000–2010), Limkokwing Institute of Creative Technology (1991–2000)
- Type: Private
- Established: 1991; 35 years ago
- Students: 30,000+
- Location: Cyberjaya, Selangor, Malaysia
- Campus: Cyberjaya, Kuching, Gaborone, Phnom Penh, Maseru, London, Mbabane, Freetown, Namataba.
- Website: www.limkokwing.net
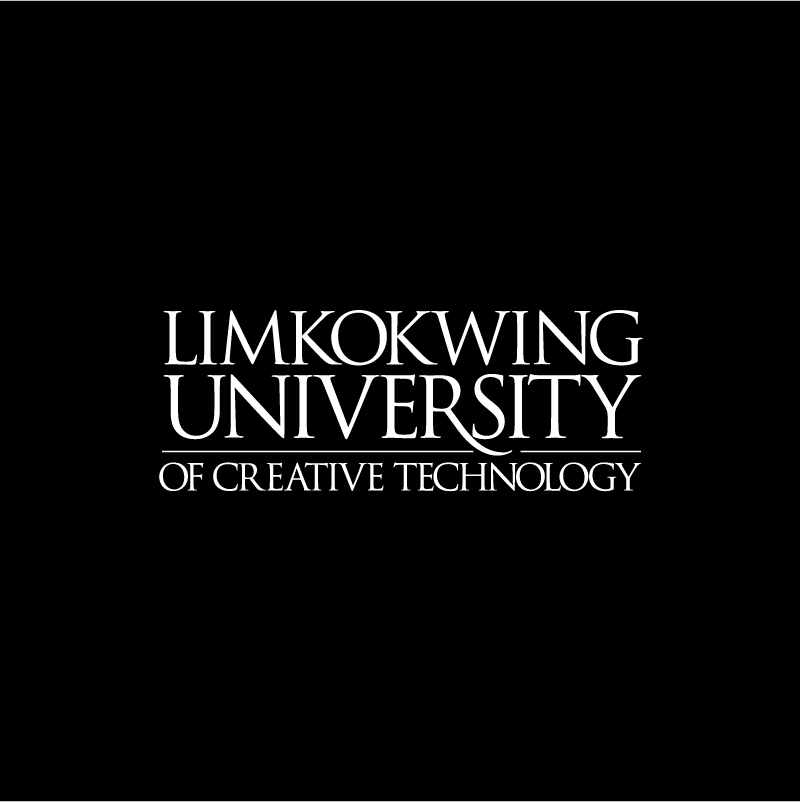

Limkokwing University of Creative Technology (also called Limkokwing and LUCT) is a private university that has a presence across Africa, Europe, and Asia. With its main campus in Malaysia, the university has over 30,000 students from more than 150 countries.

The university offers a wide range of programs at the undergraduate and postgraduate levels in various fields of study, including design, multimedia, communication, business, and technology.

In addition to academic programs, the university offers various extracurricular activities, clubs, and societies for students to participate in, including sports, performing arts, cultural activities, and community service.

== History ==
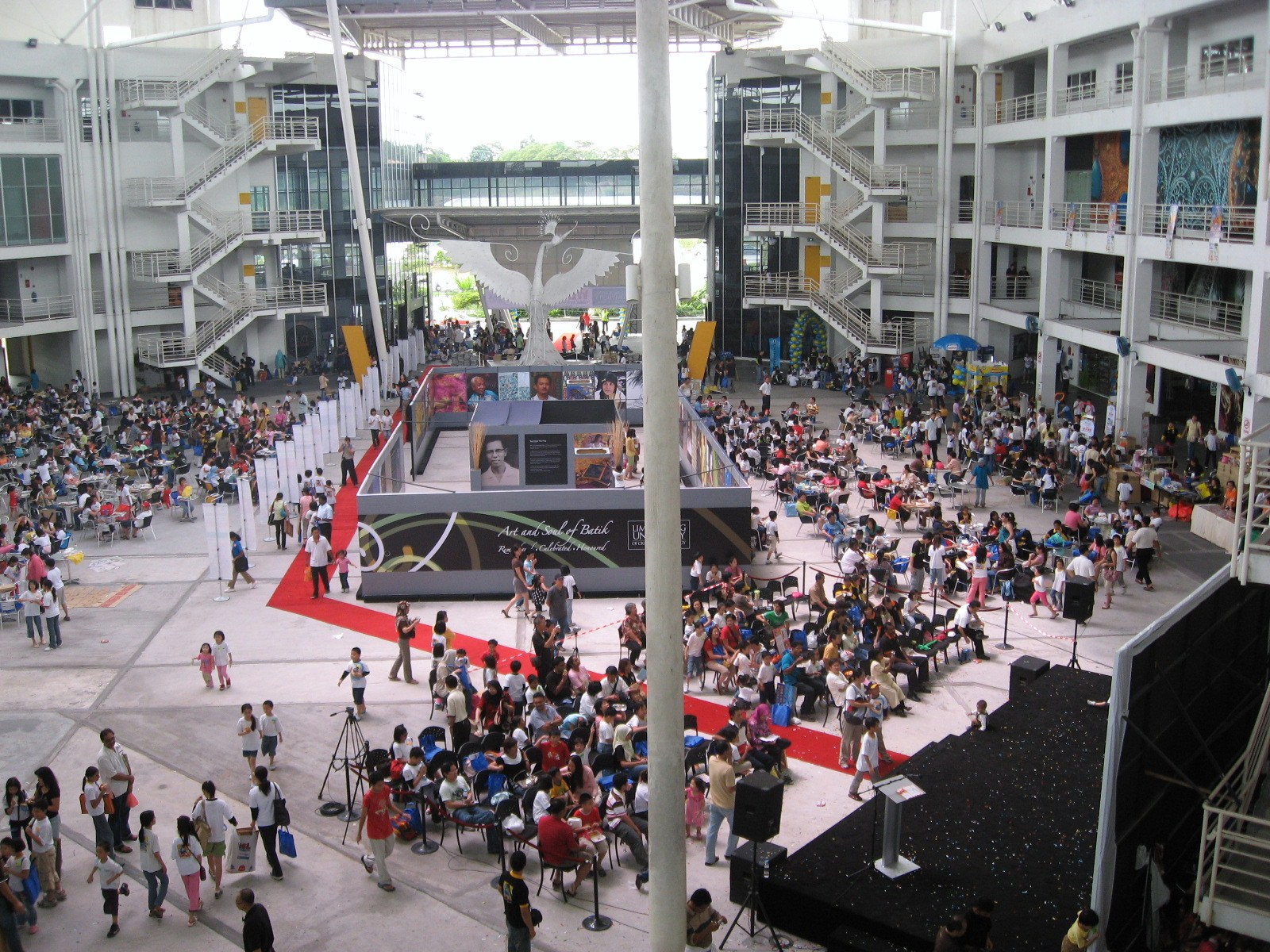
Limkokwing University of Creative Technology main atrium in Cyberjaya

LUCT was established and founded in 1991 by Lim Kok Wing. In 2002, it became the first private college to be recognised as a university college.

== Campuses ==
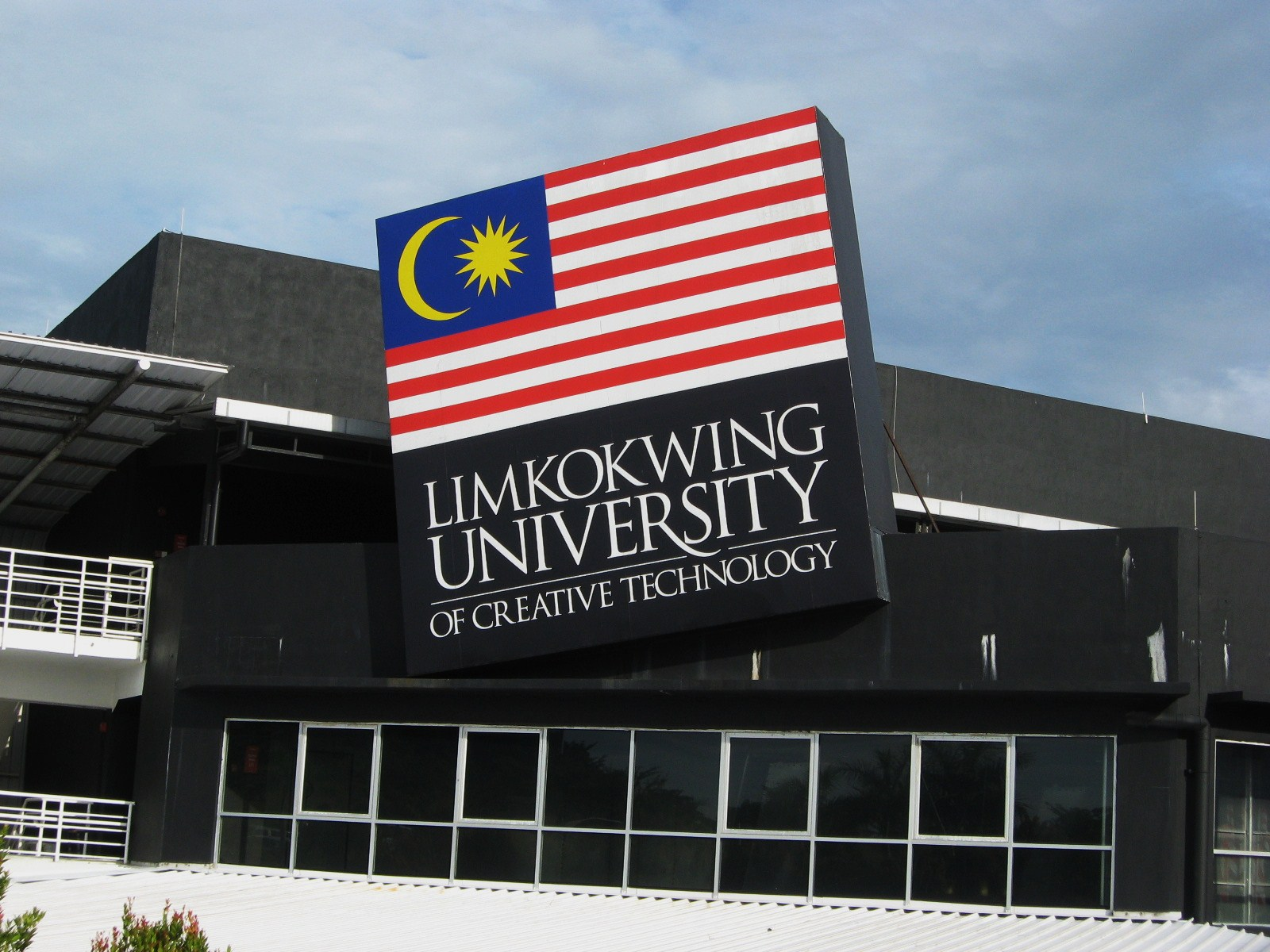
Limkokwing University of Creative Technology

As of December 2018, the university had the following campuses:

- The Limkokwing Borneo campus in Kuching, Sarawak.
- The Limkokwing Botswana campus in Gaborone.
- Limkokwing Cambodia in Phnom Penh.
- Limkokwing Lesotho in Maseru, Lesotho, the first Malaysian university campus in Lesotho.
- The Limkokwing Malaysia is the flagship campus, in Cyberjaya, Selangor.
- Limkokwing United Kingdom campus in London.
- The Limkokwing Swaziland campus is in Mbabane, Eswatini.
- The Limkokwing Sierra Leone campus in Freetown.
- The Limkokwing Uganda campus in Namataba.

== Academics ==
As of 2022, Limkokwing offers two diploma programs and twenty-two bachelor's degree programs.

== Rankings ==
| Year | Rank | Valuer |
|---|---|---|
| 2012 | 251-300 | QS Asian University Rankings |
| 2013 | 251-300 | QS Asian University Rankings |
| 2014 | 251-300 | QS Asian University Rankings |
| 2015 | 251-300 | QS Asian University Rankings |
| 2016 | 251-300 | QS Asian University Rankings |
| 2017 | 251-300 | QS Asian University Rankings |
| 2018 | 218 | QS Asian University Rankings |
| 2019 | 351-400 | QS Asian University Rankings |

== Controversy ==
In light of the global Black Lives Matter and anti-racism movement, the university was panned for the erection of a billboard depicting its founder, Tan Sri Lim Kok Wing, as the "King of Africa". The billboard generated controversy as former students and staff at the university accused the university of having racist policies, such as not allowing African students to be ambassadors at open days and alleging that school administrators had made racist remarks on several occasions. The controversial billboard was taken down and the university apologised, saying that it "did not condone any discriminatory acts against any particular race". Contrary to allegations, the Ministry of Higher Education has not found strong evidence pointing to racism by senior management of the Limkokwing University of Creative Technology (LUCT).

The institution was accused of issuing fake certificates and failing to meet legitimacy standards in Lesotho. It was followed by police investigation and court cases that showed cases of fraud. However, the Minister of Education and Training Lesotho stated that Limkokwing Lesotho is a legal and legitimate entity recognised by the Lesotho government, and graduates of the university are as well recognised.

Earlier, an official statement was released by the Minister of Information of Sierra Leone, Mohammad Rahman Swarray, to address the government's position on Limkokwing University. Sierra Leone's ACC closed investigations of alleged corruption between Limkokwing University Sierra Leone with the previous Sierra Leonean Government. It was said that the university failed to honour the agreement made by the Government of Sierra Leone and the institution regarding scholarships, fee payment, hiring of 80% local staff, and the training of 200 public servants each year. The Minister of Information stated, "the government has reached the decision, that we'll no longer be blackmailed". Later on, Sierra Leone’s Anti-Corruption Commission (ACC) has confirmed that it is the country's former education science and technology minister, Minkailu Bah, who had enabled the campus to be set up without following due processes. In addition, cases of unjust work ethics, under-qualified lecturers, falsification of academic transcripts, inequality in pay and underpay raised concerns in Botswana where the Malaysian university has a campus. Limkokwing University Botswana reached an agreement with Botswana's Allied Workers Union and salaries and wages of employees were adjusted accordingly.

== See also ==
- List of universities in Eswatini
- Education in Eswatini
