= List of liberal arts colleges =

Liberal arts colleges are primarily colleges or universities with an emphasis upon undergraduate study in the liberal arts. The Encyclopædia Britannica Concise offers the following definition of the liberal arts as a, "college or university curriculum aimed at imparting general knowledge and developing general intellectual capacities, in contrast to a professional, vocational, or technical curriculum." Although the genesis for what is known today as the liberal arts college began in Europe, the term is commonly associated with the United States. Liberal arts colleges are found in countries all over the world as well. See the list (link) of international members of the Association of American Colleges and Universities for other institutions offering liberal arts education programs.

== A ==
=== Afghanistan ===
- American University of Afghanistan in Kabul

=== Australia ===
- Campion College in Sydney
- Charles Sturt University
- University of Sydney
- University of Adelaide

== B ==
=== Bangladesh ===
- Asian University for Women in Chittagong
- University of Liberal Arts Bangladesh in Dhaka

=== Belgium ===
- Vesalius College in Brussels

=== Bulgaria ===
- American University in Bulgaria in Blagoevgrad

== C ==
=== Canada ===
- Acadia University in Wolfville, Nova Scotia
- Bishop's University in Lennoxville, Québec
- Booth University College in Winnipeg, Manitoba
- The College of the Humanities at Carleton University in Ottawa, Ontario
- Cape Breton University in Sydney, Nova Scotia
- Crandall University in Moncton, New Brunswick
- Glendon College in Toronto, Ontario (a division of York University)
- Huron University College (affiliated college of the University of Western Ontario)
- King's University College (affiliated college of the University of Western Ontario)
- The King's University in Edmonton, Alberta
- Mount Allison University in Sackville, New Brunswick
- Mount Saint Vincent University in Halifax, Nova Scotia
- Our Lady Seat of Wisdom Academy (now College) in Barry's Bay, Ontario
- Redeemer University College in Ancaster, Ontario
- Saint Mary's University in Halifax, Nova Scotia
- St. Francis Xavier University in Antigonish, Nova Scotia
- St. Thomas More College in Saskatoon, Saskatchewan (a federated college of the University of Saskatchewan)
- St. Thomas University in Fredericton, New Brunswick
- Trinity Western University in Langley, British Columbia
- Tyndale University College in Toronto, Ontario
- Université Sainte-Anne in Church Point, Nova Scotia
- University of Alberta Augustana Faculty, Alberta
- University of King's College in Halifax, Nova Scotia
- University of Lethbridge in Lethbridge, Alberta

=== China ===
- NYU Shanghai in Pudong, Shanghai

=== Czech Republic ===
- Faculty of Humanities, Charles University, Prague

== E ==
=== Ecuador ===
- Universidad San Francisco de Quito

=== Egypt ===
- American University in Cairo

=== Estonia ===
- Tallinn University Catherine's College

== F ==
=== France ===
- American University of Paris
- Chavagnes Studium

== G ==
=== Germany ===
- Bard College Berlin in Berlin
- University College Freiburg in Freiburg
- Witten/Herdecke University in Witten
- Leuphana University in Lüneburg

=== Ghana ===
- Ashesi University

=== Greece ===
- American College of Thessaloniki

== H ==
=== Hong Kong ===
- Hang Seng University of Hong Kong

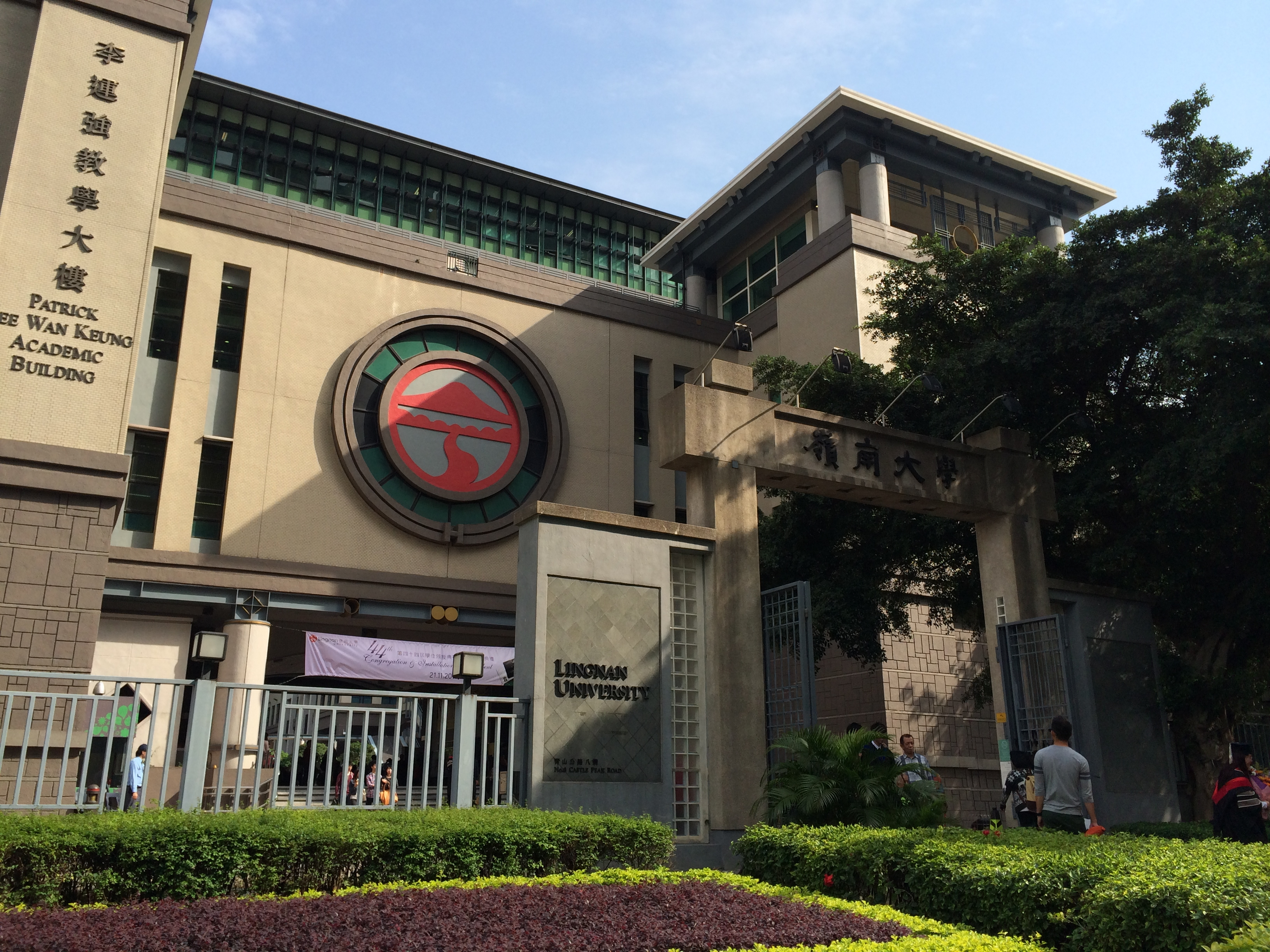
Lingnan University

- Centennial College
- Lingnan University
- Hong Kong Shue Yan University

=== Hungary ===
- McDaniel College Budapest

== I ==
=== India ===
- Ahmedabad University in Ahmedabad
- Ashoka University in Sonepat
- Krea University in Sri City
- Symbiosis School for Liberal Arts in Pune
- O.P. Jindal Global University – Jindal School of Liberal Arts and Humanities, Sonepat, Haryana
- Christ University, Bangalore, Karnataka
- Shiv Nadar University, Greater Noida, Uttar Pradesh
- Bennett University, Greater Noida, Uttar Pradesh
- Amity University, Mumbai, Maharashtra
- Thapar Institute of Engineering and Technology – School of Liberal Arts and Sciences, Patiala, Punjab
- Parul University, Vadodara, Gujarat

=== Iraq ===
- The American University of Iraq – Sulaimani

=== Israel ===
- Shalem College in Jerusalem

=== Italy ===
- American University of Rome
- John Cabot University

=== Indonesia ===
- Universitas Pelita Harapan

== J ==
=== Japan ===
- Soka University of Japan, Tokyo
- The College of Liberal Arts, International Christian University in Tokyo
- College of Arts and Sciences, The University of Tokyo (Komaba campus) in Tokyo
- International College of Liberal Arts, Yamanashi Gakuin University in Kofu

== L ==
=== Lithuania ===
- Vytautas Magnus University in Kaunas
- LCC International University in Klaipėda

== N ==
=== The Netherlands ===
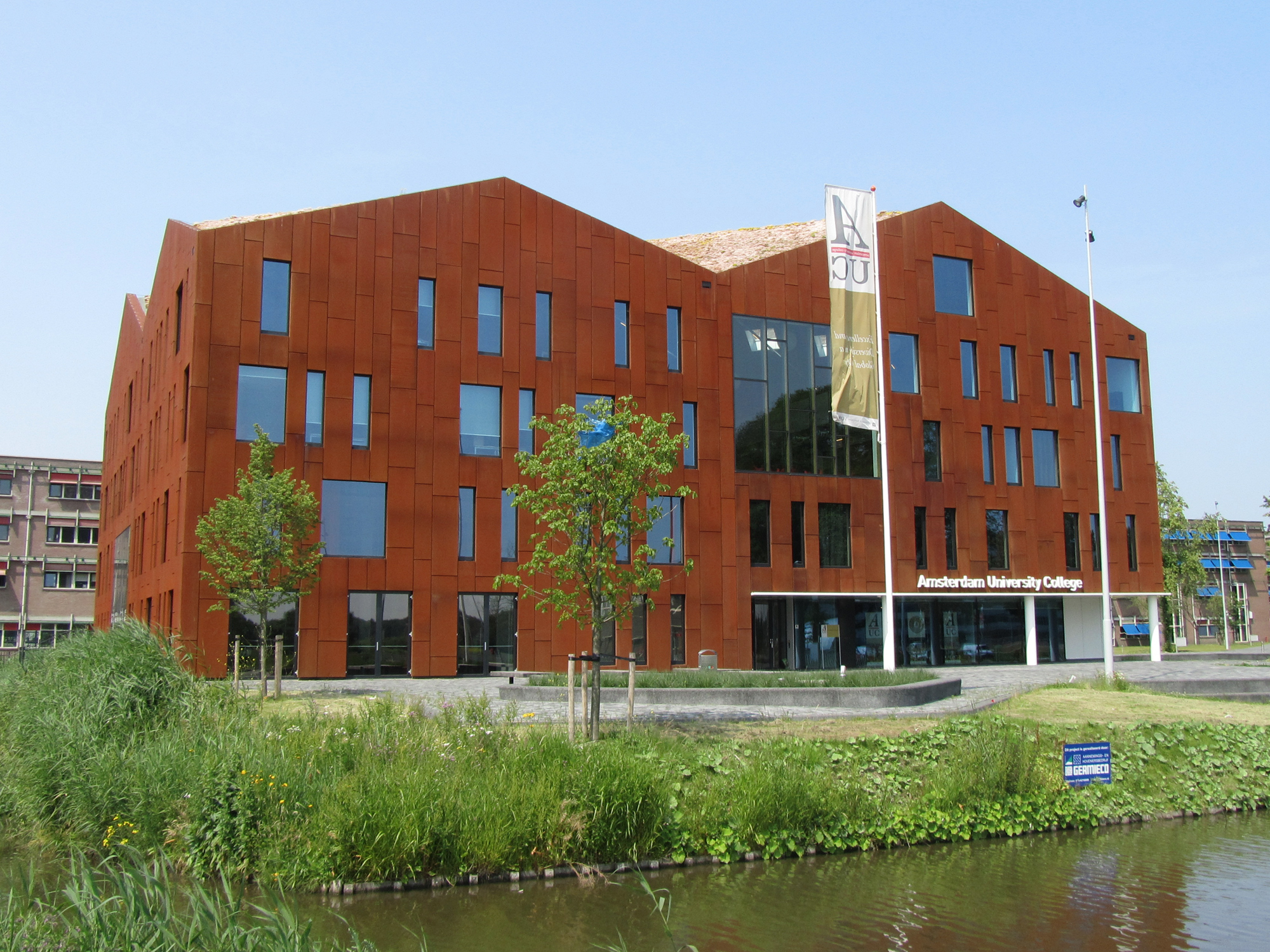
Amsterdam University College

- Amsterdam University College in Amsterdam
- Erasmus University College in Rotterdam
- University College Groningen in Groningen
- Leiden University College The Hague in The Hague
- University College ATLAS, Academy of Technology, Liberal Arts & Sciences in Enschede
- University College Maastricht in Maastricht
- University College Roosevelt in Middelburg
- University College Utrecht, in Utrecht
- University College Tilburg, University of Tilburg in Tilburg

== P ==
=== Pakistan ===
- Forman Christian College in Lahore
- Habib University in Karachi

== R ==
=== Russia ===
- Smolny College in St. Petersburg

== S ==
=== Slovakia ===
- BISLA in Bratislava

=== Spain ===
- Saint Louis University Madrid Campus

=== Switzerland ===
- Franklin University Switzerland

== T ==
=== Thailand ===
- Mahidol University International College

== U ==
=== United Kingdom ===
- New College of the Humanities
- Richmond University
- St. Mary's University College, Queen's University Belfast

=== United Arab Emirates ===
- New York University Abu Dhabi

== V ==
=== Vietnam ===
- Fulbright University Vietnam
