= Samuel Abrahám =

Slovakian educator

- Born: 1960 (age 65–66); Bratislava, Slovakia
- Known for: Liberal arts education in Europe
- Office: Rector of Bratislava International School of Liberal Arts

Academic background
- Education: University of Toronto, Carleton University

Academic work
- Discipline: Political science, political philosophy
- Institutions: Bratislava International School of Liberal Arts (BISLA)

Samuel Abrahám (born 1960 in Bratislava) is rector of Bratislava International School of Liberal Arts, a small liberal arts college in Bratislava, Slovakia. Samuel Abrahám studied political science and political philosophy at the University of Toronto and at Carleton University in Ottawa, Ontario, Canada.

== Education Innovator ==
Samuel Abrahám is currently involved in ECOLAS - a network of universities supported by European funding in order to spread and support liberal arts education in Europe.

== Membership of organizations ==
From 1996 to 2004 he was representative of the Project on Ethnic Relations, a Princeton-based foundation focusing on resolving ethnic tensions in Central and Eastern Europe. He is also a member of the advisory board of Eurozine - an internet journal of a network of European cultural journals.

== Academic posts ==
From 1990 onwards he helped to establish and lectured at Political science department at Comenius University. In 1996 he founded and has since edited Slovak-English cultural journal Kritika & Kontext. During 1996 - 2006 he founded and directed Society for Higher Learning, an educational institution for gifted university students. In 2006 he co-founded and has been the rector of Bratislava International School of Liberal Arts (BISLA).
