= ECOLAS =

- Founders: Samuel Abrahám; Hans Adriaansens; Laurent Boetsch
- Type: Non-governmental organisation
- Purpose: Consulting on liberal arts undergraduate education
- Headquarters: Europe
- Region served: Europe
- Website: www.ecolas.eu

The European Consortium of Liberal Arts and Sciences, or ECOLAS, is a non-governmental educational consulting group based in Europe, that proposes to address key issues associated with liberal arts undergraduate education as a consequence of the reforms initiated by the Bologna Process. It was founded by three international educators, Samuel Abraham, President and Rector of the Bratislava International School of Liberal Arts (Slovakia), Hans Adriaansens, Dean of Roosevelt Academy (Netherlands), and Laurent Boetsch, President Emeritus of European College of Liberal Arts, Berlin (Germany).

== Mission ==
The mission of ECOLAS is to work within the sphere of European undergraduate education to foster and disseminate good practices essential to nurturing the ideals and skills necessary for lifelong learning and good citizenship that are embedded in the educational tradition of the liberal arts and sciences.

== Organization ==
The consortium is a voluntary association headed by an Executive Board formed by the three founders and Jochen Fried of the Salzburg Global Seminar. The Board is responsible for the overall supervision, implementation and evaluation of projects undertaken. ECOLAS Associates are a team of international educational experts who work in association with the consortium and who are assigned to projects depending on their particular areas.

== Current projects ==
ECOLAS has recently received a grant form the European Union as an Erasmus Multilateral Project within its Modernisation of Higher Education initiative in Lifelong Learning Programme. Those funds are expected to meet three-quarters of the costs of operation for the first two-years of the consortium. Projects planned within the course of the grant funding include: the preparation of a comprehensive information manual on the history, values, and methodology of the liberal arts and their potential for undergraduate education in Europe; a major conference for associates, institutional partners, and interested parties to focus on the practical aspects of establishing a liberal arts programme; a "flying advisors" initiative to provide expert advice to partner institutions and newly established liberal arts programmes; the creation of a database of information concerning current initiatives in the liberal arts; the establishment of a website detailing consortial activities and providing a central source of information about liberal arts education in Europe; an outline of a quality assurance framework with criteria and procedures for current and emerging programmes in the liberal arts.

== Members ==
Institutions	Countries
AMEU – Institutum Studiorum Humanitatis	Slovenia
Amsterdam University College	The Netherlands
ATLAS, University College Twente	The Netherlands
BISLA (Bratislava International School of Liberal Arts)	Slovakia
Charles University (Faculty of Humanities)	(Czech Republic) Czechia
European Humanities University	Lithuania
Global Governance, University of Rome Tor Vergata	Italy
King’s College London	United Kingdom
LCC International University	Lithuania
Leiden University College	The Netherlands
Leuphana University Lüneburg	Germany
Liverpool Hope University	United Kingdom
Royal Holloway, University of London	United Kingdom
St Mary’s University College	United Kingdom
University College Freiburg	Germany
University College Groningen	The Netherlands
University College London	United Kingdom
University College Maastricht	The Netherlands
University College Roosevelt	The Netherlands
University College Tilburg	The Netherlands
University of Birmingham	United Kingdom
University of Hamburg	Germany
University of Kent	United Kingdom
University of Warwick	United Kingdom
Vytautas Magnus University	Lithuania

== See also ==
- Alliance of Asian Liberal Arts Universities
- Global Liberal Arts Alliance
- Liberal arts colleges in the United States
