= University College Freiburg =

University in Germany

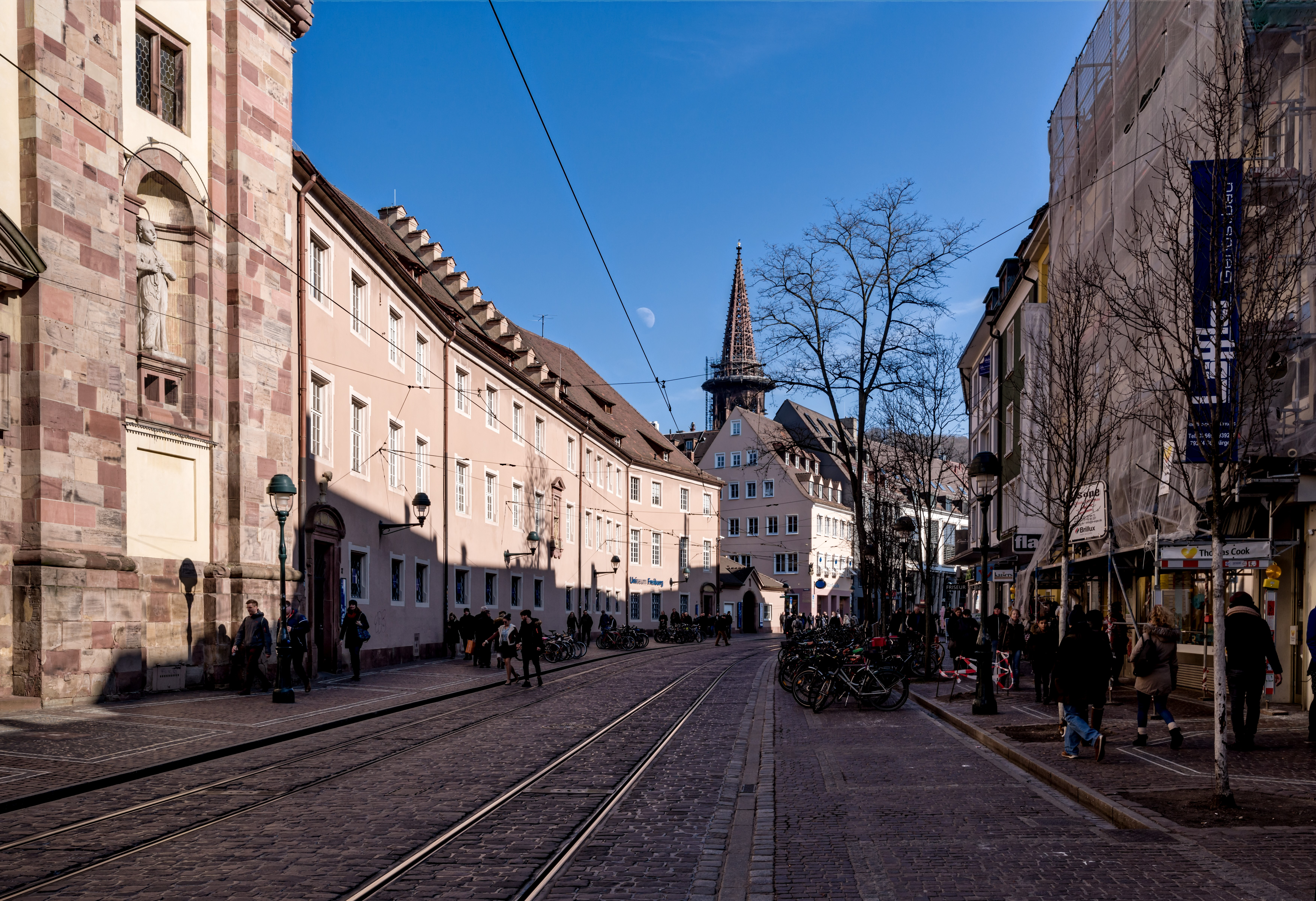
- Type: Public
- Established: 2012
- Parent institution: University of Freiburg
- Dean: Prof. Dr. Frieder Vogelmann
- Academic Director: Paul Sterzel
- Students: 320
- Location: Bertoldstraße 17, Freiburg im Breisgau, Baden-Württemberg, Germany
- Language: English
- Website: www.ucf.uni-freiburg.de
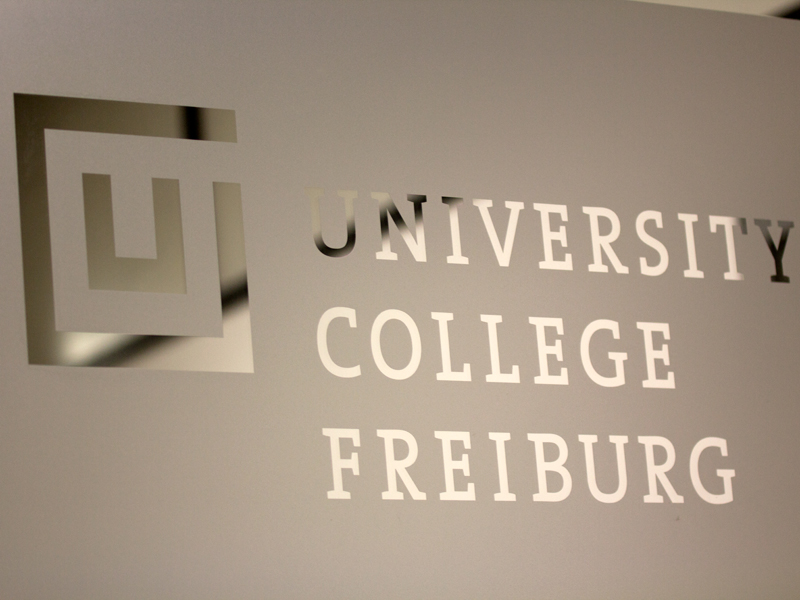

University College Freiburg (UCF) is the central institution for international and interdisciplinary teaching at the University of Freiburg. Its main project is hosting the first public English-language Liberal Arts and Sciences program in Germany. UCF students follow a four-year bachelor program consisting of 240 ECTS credits, and graduate with either a Bachelor of Science or a Bachelor of Arts. UCF serves as a lab for innovative teaching approaches and instructional design.

== Curriculum ==
Of the 240 credits needed to graduate, 56 are core courses, 120 are in a student's chosen major, and 64 are electives. Most core courses are taken in the first year of studies, covering academic skills, philosophy, and responsible leadership. Later core courses include philosophy of science and further academic skills. First year students are also required to take introductions to three of the four offered majors. Students are able to major in life sciences, earth and sustainability sciences, culture and history, and governance. Electives can be taken at UCF, in the greater University of Freiburg, or during studies abroad. Electives can also be taken in the form of internships and self-directed practical projects.

Most of UCF's courses have some element of interdisciplinarity to them. Some courses explore an already-established interdisciplinary subject, like political ecology. Others look at contemporary problems through a combination of disciplines. Others still may teach specific academic and technological skills needed in different disciplines, or require assignments to consider information from more than one field.

== Student Life ==
Students at UCF are represented by an elected board of twelve student office holders. These students are elected once per semester and act as the link between the student body and different university staff. The board meets at weekly student council meetings, and at larger general assemblies twice per semester. Alumni are a part of a subgroup within the greater University of Freiburg alumni association.

UCF is home to a range of funded student interest groups. The college hosts a magazine publishing group, a 3D printing group, an arts collective, and an Model United Nations team. Other groups host environmental seminars, cultural discussions, and camping trips. angLES was a student-run academic journal.

== Campus ==
UCF is located within Freiburg's Old University, which lies in the heart of Freiburg's old city. The building is also home to the Uniseum, a museum and conference center. It is connected to the right side of the University Church. The building has undergone renovations to be wheelchair accessible. By transit, it is best accessed by the 'Stadttheater' tram stop.

While most classes take place in UCF, classes will occasionally take place in other University of Freiburg buildings. Students at UCF have access to the greater University of Freiburg campus and amenities, including the University Library and discounted student transit ticket.

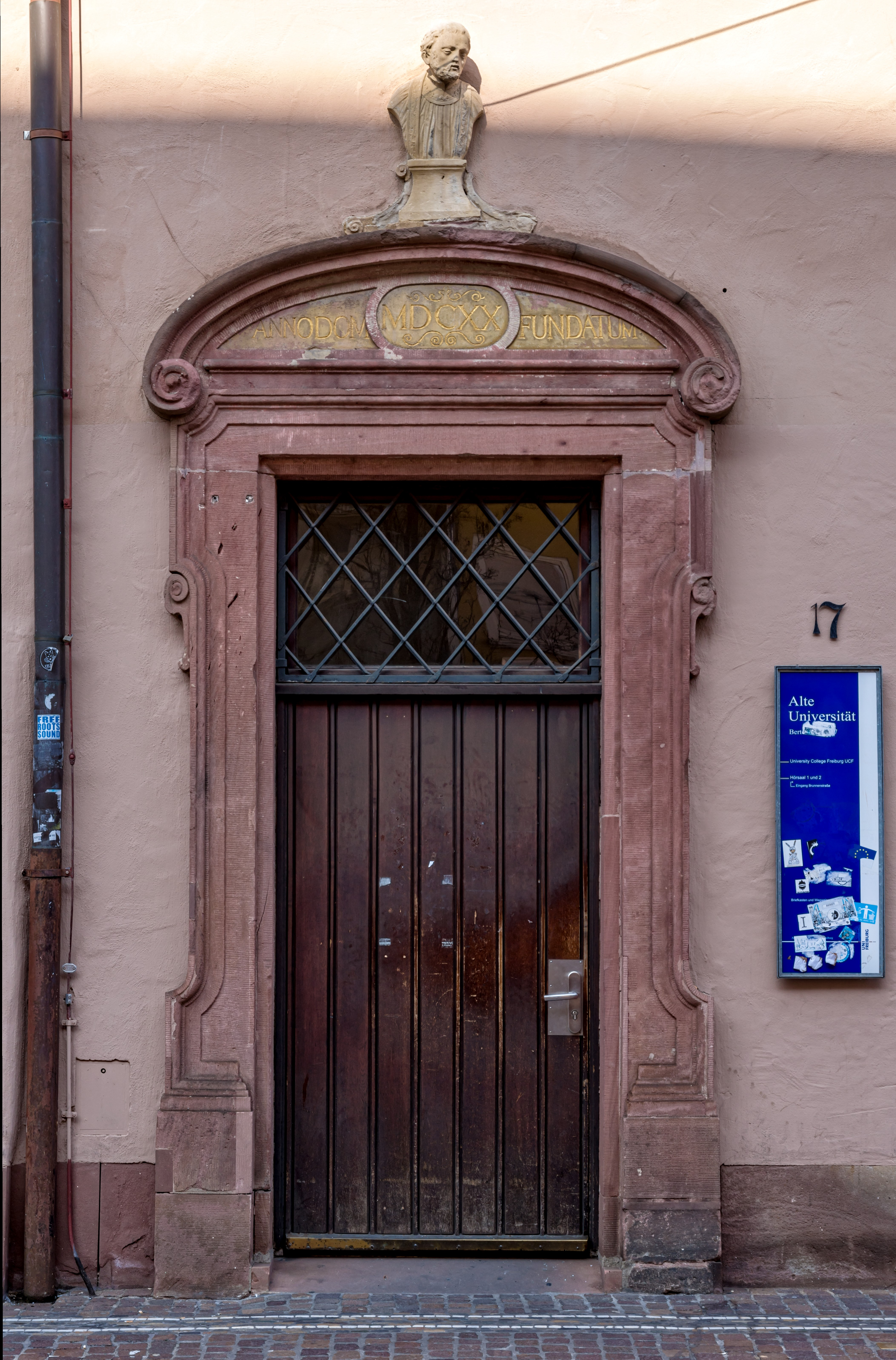
Entrance to UCF

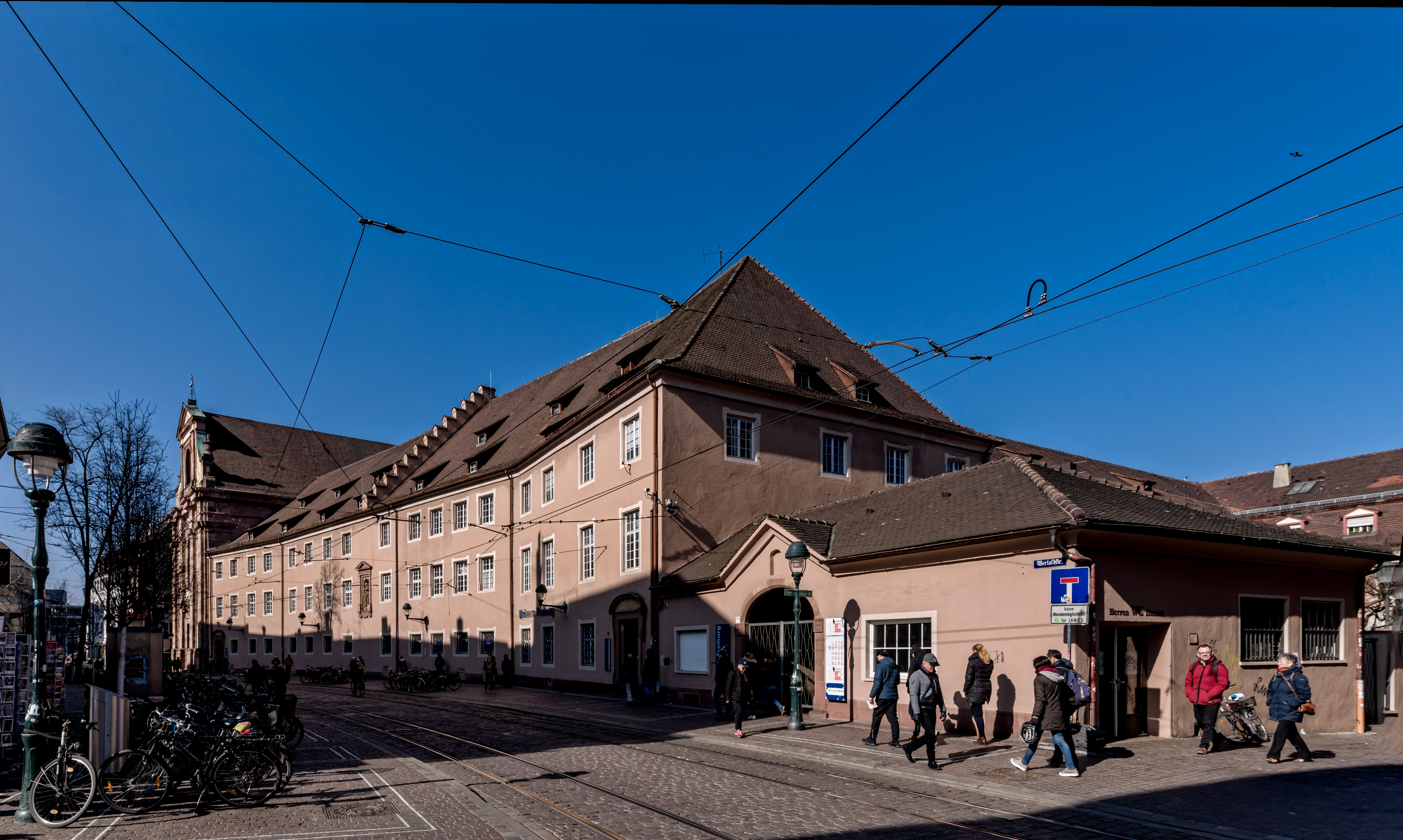
The Old University

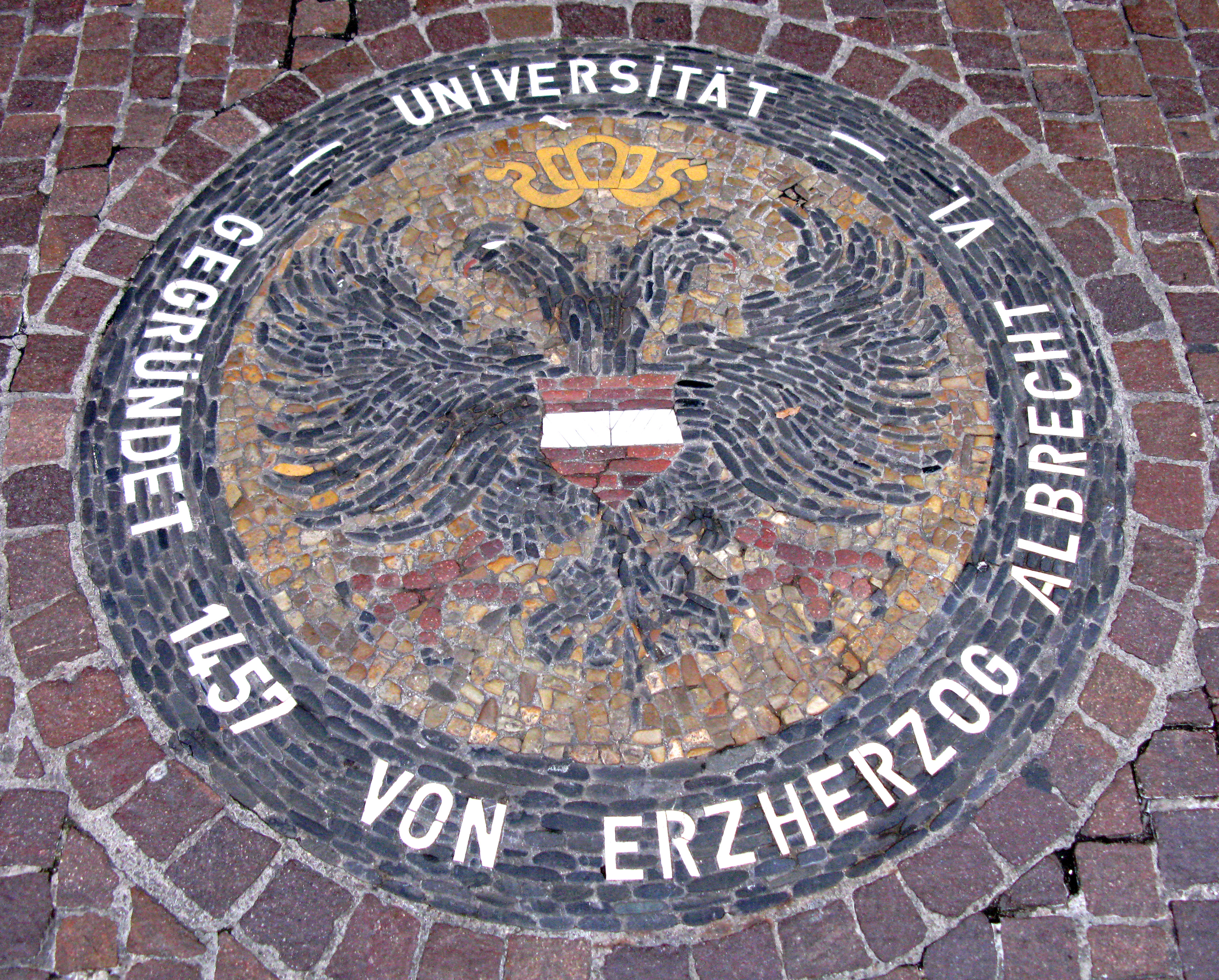
Traditional Freiburg Mosaic in front of the University Church

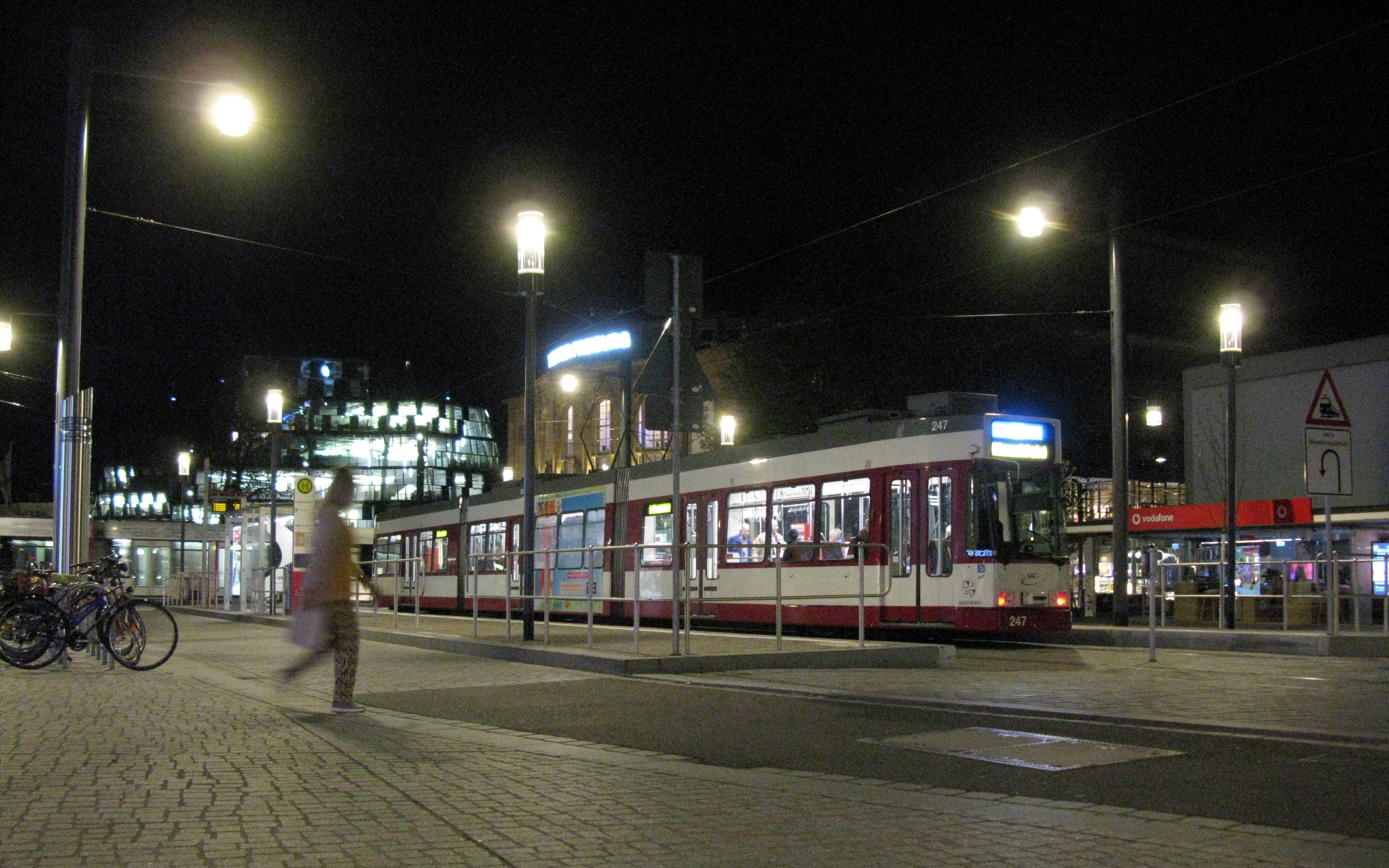
Stadttheater Tram Stop

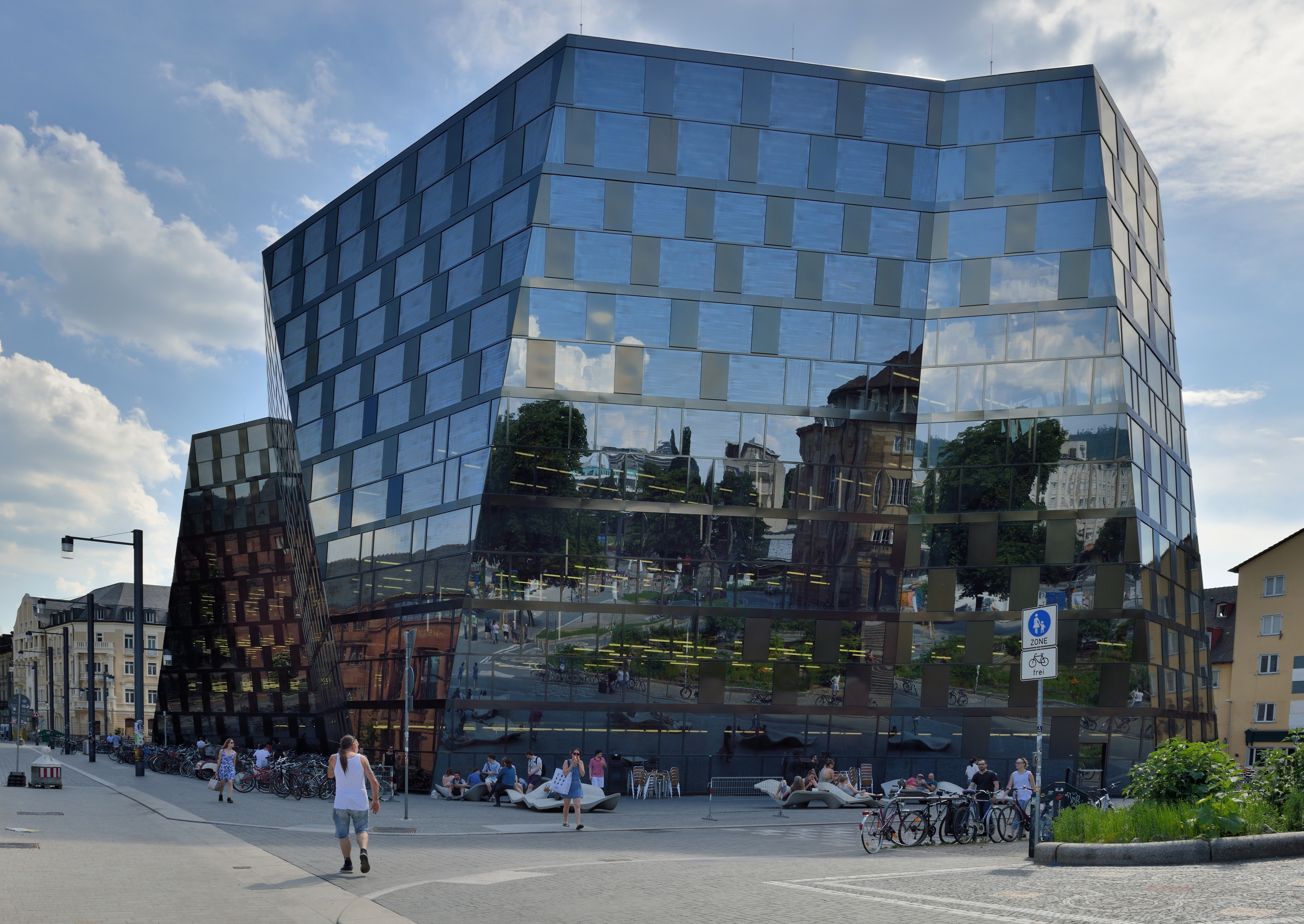
Freiburg University Library

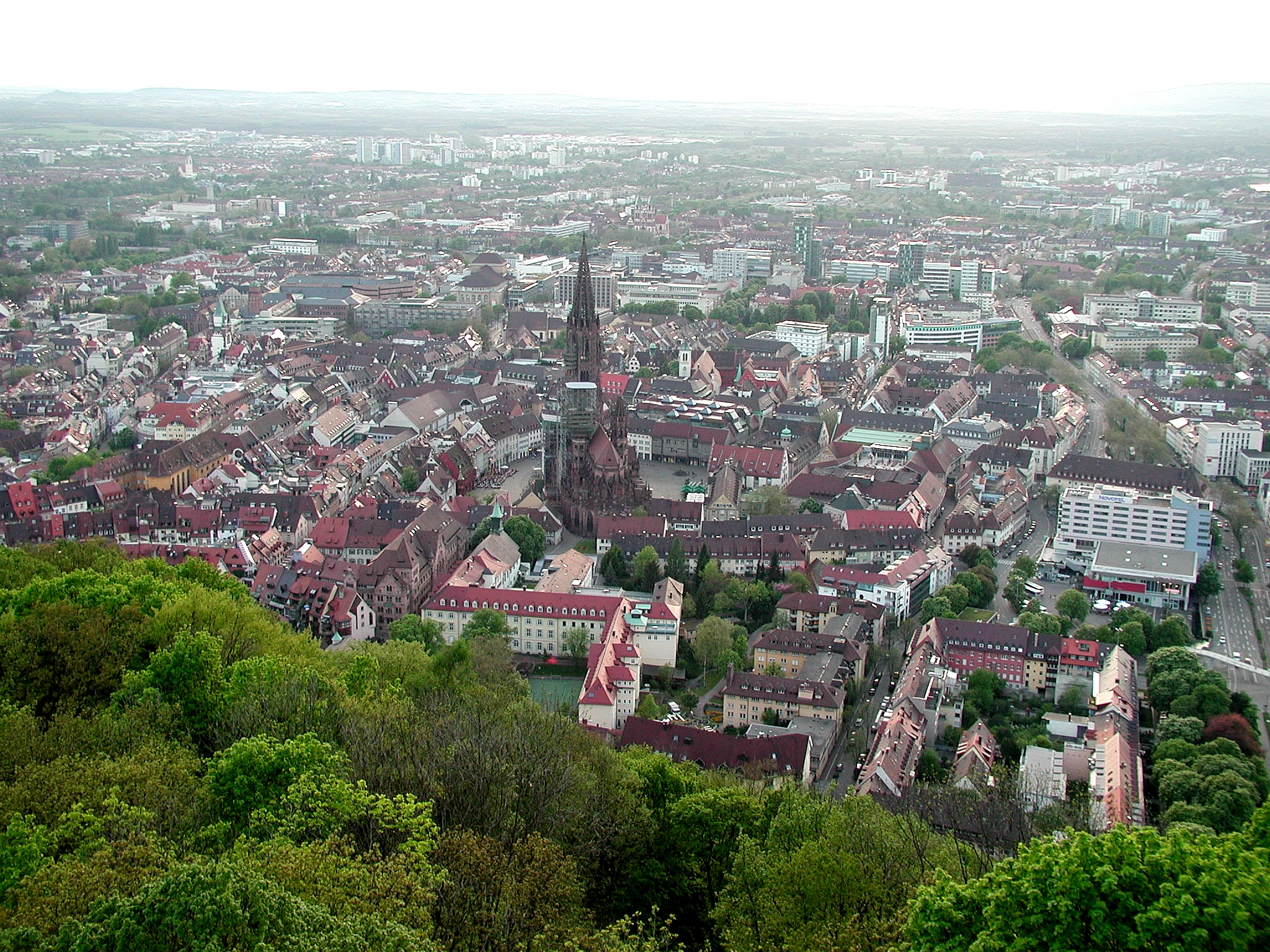
Freiburg's Old City

== Administration ==
The UCF calendar closely follows the University of Freiburg calendar. which is split into two semesters, and begins with the winter semester. The winter semester runs from mid-October to mid-February, with a two-week Christmas break, The summer semester runs from mid-April to the end of July, with a week off for Pentecost. The university is not open on federal or state holidays.

Each student is obligated to pay a 150€ registration fee per semester. These fees partially fund the Freiburg Student Association, which provides assistance to students. In accordance with the state of Baden-Württemberg, international students are obligated to pay an extra €1500 per semester, and students seeking a second degree are obligated to pay an extra €650 per semester.

UCF is officially accredited by the University of Freiburg, which draws its authority from the Central Evaluation and Accreditation Agency. The CEEA (ZEvA) is one of ten official accreditation agencies in Germany.

== International relations ==
Students are able to study abroad in their third year, with 80% of students doing so. Students can study abroad at a UCF partner institution, at a University of Freiburg partner, or at a university they choose on themselves.

UCF students are able to participate in a double degree program with the University College Maastricht, letting participants from both schools graduate with two bachelor's degrees. UCF students are also able to take courses at any of the partner universities within EUCOR.

University College Freiburg is an exchange destination for University College Utrecht students. It has exchange partnership with School of International Liberal Studies, Waseda University.

UCF is a member of the European Colleges of Liberal Arts and Sciences. The first yearly Liberal Education Student Symposium was hosted by UCF in 2018. UCF is also a member of EPICUR, a group of eight universities in six countries that explore a modern and internationally connected university experience.
