= Boetsch =

Boetsch is a surname. Notable people with the surname include:

- Arnaud Boetsch (born 1969), French tennis player
- Laurent Boetsch (born 1948), American academic
- Tim Boetsch (born 1981), American mixed martial artist
