= Global Liberal Arts Alliance =

Association of liberal arts colleges

The Global Liberal Arts Alliance is an association of liberal arts colleges around the world. It was established in 2009. The goal of the consortium is to provide an international framework for cooperation among institutions following the American liberal arts college model.

The Alliance is administered by the Great Lakes Colleges Association, a consortium of thirteen American liberal arts colleges in the Great Lakes region.

== Member institutions ==
- Al Akhawayn University, Morocco
- Albion College, United States
- Allegheny College, United States
- American College of Greece, Greece
- American University in Bulgaria, Bulgaria
- American University in Cairo, Egypt
- American University of Paris, France
- Bratislava International School of Liberal Arts, Slovakia
- DePauw University, United States
- Earlham College, United States
- Effat University, Saudi Arabia
- FLAME University, India
- Forman Christian College, Pakistan
- Franklin University, Switzerland
- Hope College, United States
- International Christian University, Japan
- (Ivory Coast) International University of Grand-Bassam, Côte d'Ivoire
- John Cabot University, Italy
- Kalamazoo College, United States
- Kenyon College, United States
- Oberlin College, United States
- Ohio Wesleyan University, United States
- Universidad San Francscio de Quito, Ecuador
- Wabash College, United States
- College of Wooster, United States
- Washington & Jefferson College, United States

== See also ==
- Liberal arts college
- Alliance of Asian Liberal Arts Universities
- List of higher education associations and alliances
