= Laurent Boetsch =

American academic

Howard Laurent Boetsch (born 1948 in Philadelphia) is President Emeritus of the European College of Liberal Arts (ECLA), Berlin, and Professor of Romance Languages at Washington and Lee University in Lexington, Virginia.

== Education ==
Laurent Boetsch attended Washington and Lee University and earned his MA and Doctor of Modern Languages degrees at Middlebury College in Middlebury, Vermont.

== Career ==
Boetsch is a founding member of ECOLAS, a non-profit consulting group dedicated to the promotion and cultivation of liberal arts education in Europe.

In addition to his work with ECOLAS, Boetsch is on the Board of Advisors to the Hamilton College Academic Year in Spain study program and currently serves as a Senior Advisor to the European College of Liberal Arts, Berlin.

Boetsch has been a Visiting Exchange Fellow at University College, Oxford, and Visiting Professor at the Hamilton College Academic Year in Spain program in Madrid. He served formerly as Vice President for Academic Affairs and Dean of the College, Acting President, and Provost of Washington and Lee University.
