= University College Groningen =

- Type: Public liberal arts college
- Established: 2014
- Parent institution: University of Groningen
- Dean: Prof. Dr. Joke Fleer (since March 2024)
- Academic staff: 50
- Administrative staff: 20
- Students: 360
- Location: Hoendiepskade 23–24, Groningen, Groningen, 9718 BG, Netherlands; 53.215239°N 6.554669°E
- Campus: Urban
- Language: English
- Colors: Groningen red
- Website: www.rug.nl/ucg/

University College Groningen (UCG) is a public liberal arts college based in Groningen, the Netherlands. The college offers a bachelor's degree in liberal arts and sciences. Established in 2014, the college currently has approximately 360 students. The university has a diversity of subjects and majors, from which students can choose. UCG is a Faculty of the University of Groningen, one of the world’s top 100 universities.

In the last 9 years, Keuzegids Universiteiten awarded UCG with the title "Top Rated Programme". It is a member of the European Colleges of Liberal Arts and Sciences.

== History ==
Established in 2014, initially 30 students enrolled in the first year of UCG. The college is housed in the former huishoudschool (household school) on Hoendiepskade. The number of attending students has grown each year. In 2017, the number of first year students increased to 115. The first class of students graduated in 2017.

== Building ==
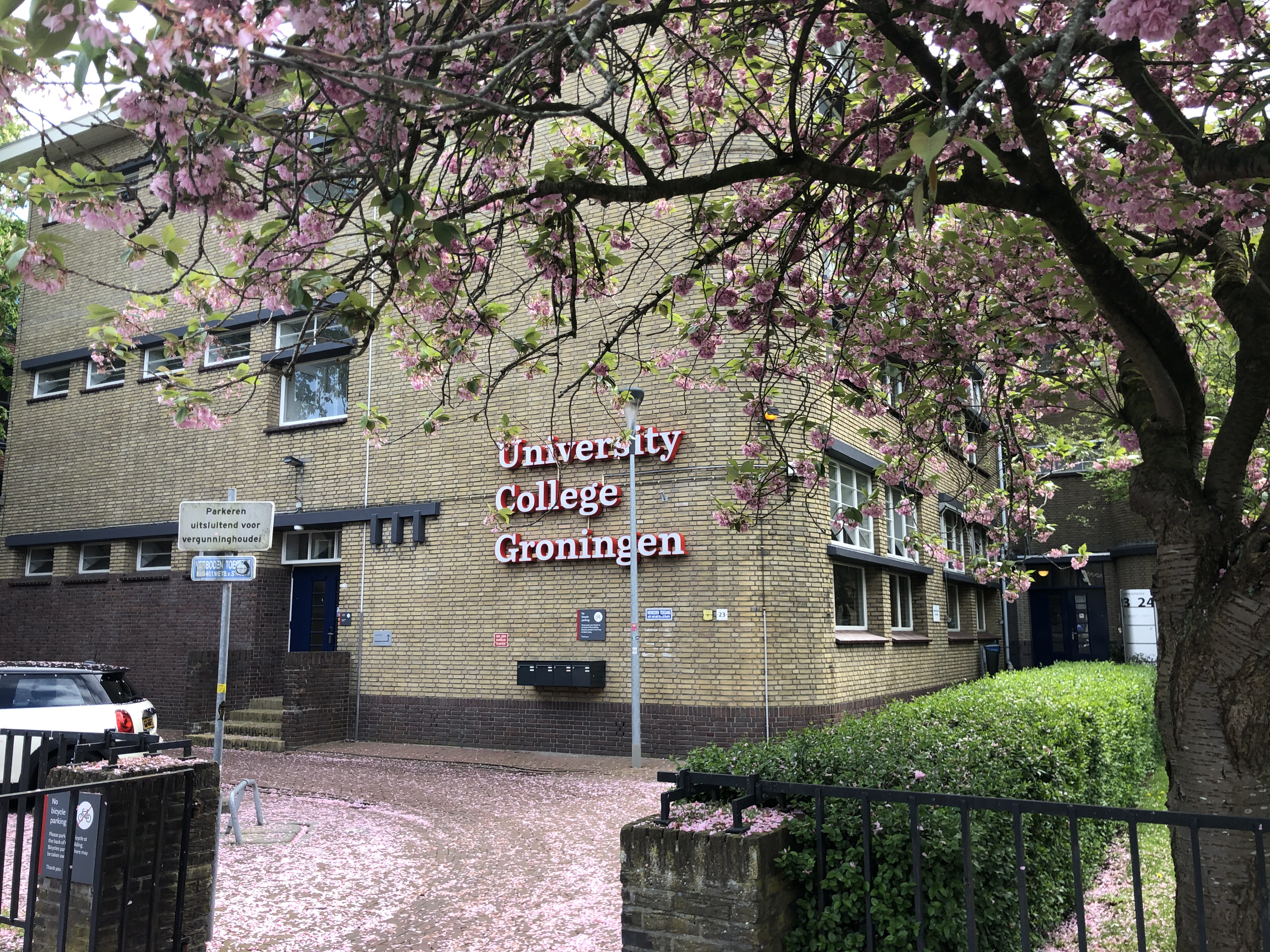
Main building located at the Hoendiepskade

University College Groningen is housed at Hoendiepskade 23/24 in Groningen. The building was built in 1932 by the architect duo Kuiler & Drewes commissioned by the Association for Christian Industry Education (Vereniging voor Christelijk Nijverheidsonderwijs). The building served as a household school for girls called the Princess Juliana school (Prinses Julianaschool). Next to the main building which is currently used by the College, stands a smaller building which functioned as a residence for the caretaker of the school.

During the second world war the building was damaged, and in 1952 the building was expanded by design of Kuiler & Drewes. In 1962 it was renovated again, this time by architect D. Broos. Since 2000 the building has functioned for office-use. Currently, the University of Groningen houses its University College in this building and is regarded as a municipal monument.

The building is built in an expressionistic professional style. The exterior is distinguishable by its use of bright yellow bricks and blue metal doors. The interior includes stained glass windows depicting various household skills such as cooking, washing and sewing.

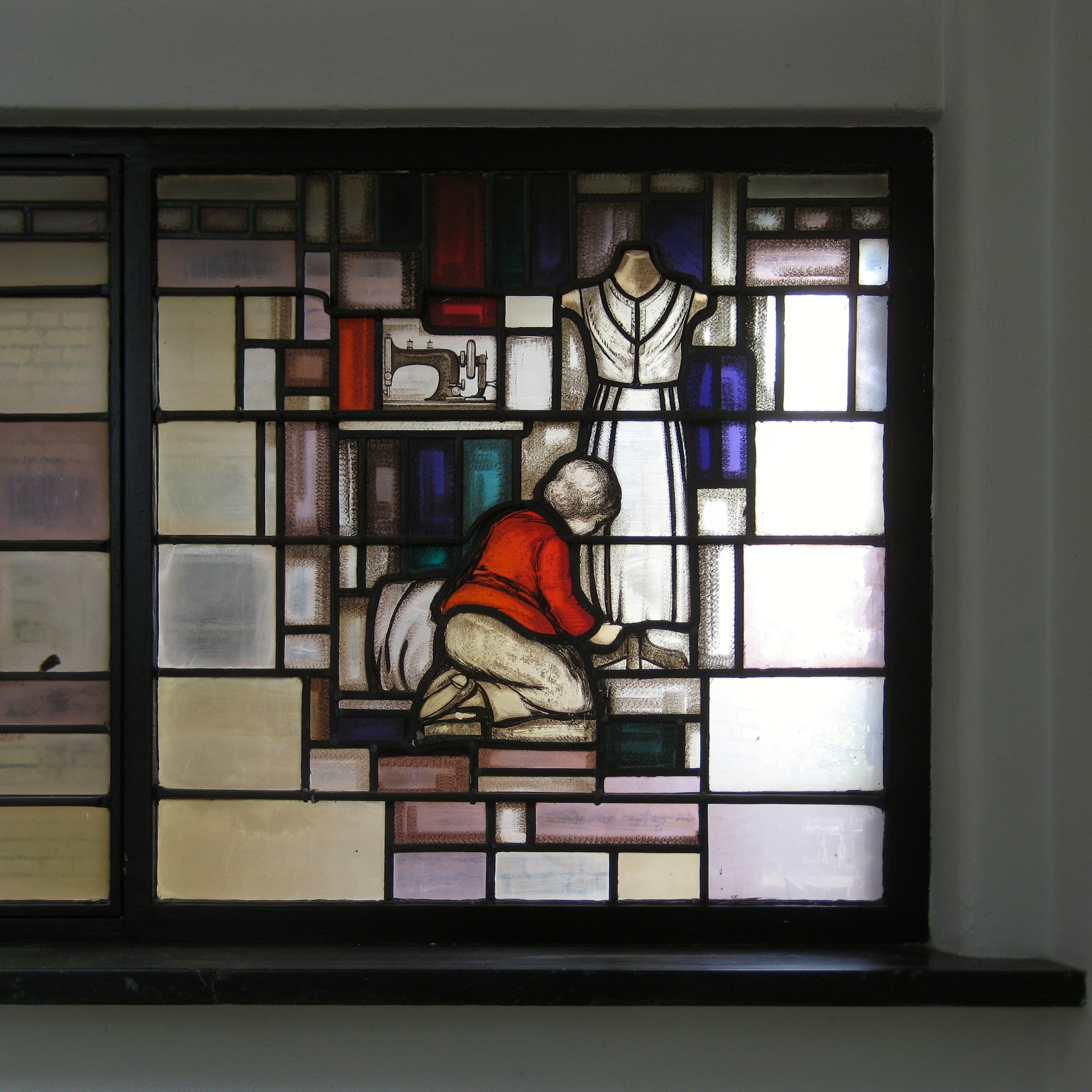
Stained glass window depicting household skills that would have been taught at the Princess Juliana school

== Education ==
Tuition fees are relatively high by Dutch standards, as the bachelor costs approximately €2000 more than other bachelor degrees in the Netherlands. These fees are usually double that of the standard tuition fees in the Netherlands for students from the EU/EEA, although this depends on the standard tuition fee mandated by the Dutch government. For non-EU/EEA students there is a similar increase, though there is no standard fee to which their fees at UCG can be compared. Admission standards are high as well, as solid grades in high school are required to be accepted.

All classes at the college are taught in English. In its three-year bachelor's degree programme, called Liberal Arts and Sciences, students can choose from a broad array of courses from different disciplines. Students can choose to major in Social Sciences, Humanities, Sciences or design a Free Major. Among the pedagogical methods employed by the college is project-based learning. Courses are taught by UCG staff, as well as professors from other faculties of the University of Groningen. University College Groningen demonstrates their academic expertise by clustering it in different fields of study. Students enjoy guidance from a dedicated team of Academic Advisors who help them with combining different academic disciplines or perspectives into a tailor-made programme that fits the interests and prospective Master choice of the student.

== Student life ==
The college has a high number of international students, as more than half of the students are from outside the Netherlands. The student association at UCG is called Caerus, which has several committees.

Students who enter the college have the option to live at the residential campus of UCG for at least the first year of their studies, which is common among liberal arts colleges in the Netherlands.
