= Bard College Berlin =

German liberal arts university

Coordinates: 52°35′03″N 13°23′38″E

- Type: Private
- Established: 1999
- Dean: Catherine Toal
- Director: Florian Becker
- Faculty: approx. 50
- Students: approx. 300
- Location: Berlin, Germany
- Campus: Niederschönhausen
- Website: berlin.bard.edu

Bard College Berlin (formerly known as ECLA or European College of Liberal Arts) is a private, non-profit institution of higher education in Berlin, Germany. It was founded as a non-profit association in 1999. Courses are taught in the English language, and the college has a high percentage of international students and international faculty. It is one of the few liberal arts colleges in Europe. Qualifying students earn both an American B.A. and a German B.A.

Bard College Berlin is a member of the Global Higher Education Alliance for the 21st Century (GHEA21).

== History ==
Bard College Berlin was founded as ECLA (a non-profit association) in 1999 under the leadership of Stephan Gutzeit. Several other scholars and entrepreneurs, German and international, contributed to its founding. The first program to be introduced was the six-week International Summer University. Later two one-year programs were developed and still continue to be offered: the Academy Year and the Project Year. A four-year Bachelor of Arts program in Humanities, the Arts, and Social Thought was launched in October 2009.

In November 2011, ECLA merged with Bard College in Annandale-on-Hudson, New York, USA, and subsequently became Bard College Berlin, A Liberal Arts University. A four-year BA program in Economics, Politics, and Social Thought was introduced in 2014.

In August 2018, one of Bard College Berlin's students, Sara Mardini, was arrested in Greece while on her way back to Berlin after having volunteered at the Moria refugee camp in Lesbos, Greece, during the summer. The university worked in conjunction with Sara's legal council and Amnesty International to guarantee her release. After 106 days in jail, she was released on a bail of 5,000 euro.

Bard College Berlin became the physical home for Smolny Beyond Borders in 2023, a distance education initiative for scholars whose educations have been interrupted by the Russo-Ukrainian war and decline of academic freedom in Russia. It was borne from Smolny College, a Russian-American collaboration between Bard College and St. Petersburg State University, which was forced to cease operations after Bard was declared an "undesirable organization" by Russian authorities in 2021.

In 2025, after the Second Trump travel ban, Bard College Berlin stepped in to accept eight international students who were accepted to prestigious universities in the United States but were unable to attend due to their national origin.

Bard College Berlin faculty Dr. Berit Ebert and Prof. Dr. Boris Vormann established the European Democracy Institute (EDI) in 2026. The Institute, baed out of Bard College Berlin, awarded the inaugural Fritz Stern Award for Democratic Engagement to Małgorzata Gersdorf, the first woman to serve as President of the Supreme Court of Poland, in January 2026 for her commitment to justice and democracy.

== Academics ==
=== Academic programs ===
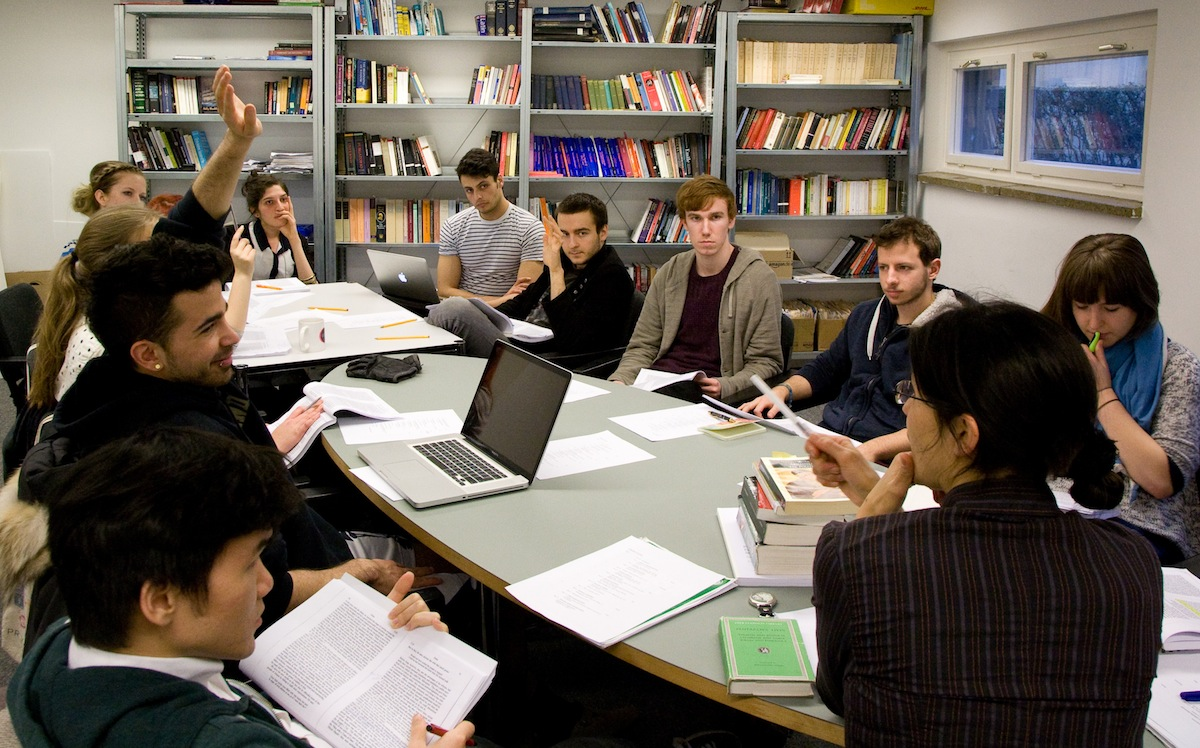
Seminar Bard College Berlin, 2013

At Bard College Berlin students may enroll in a BA degree, or in a one-semester or one-year program suitable to their profile, background, and individual aims of study. The college supports internship opportunities and practical training, and has many established connections with the intellectual and cultural life of Berlin.

Four-year students may choose from one of three academic pathways: B.A. in economics, Politics, and Social Thought; B.A. in humanities, the Arts, and Social Thought; and B.A. in Artistic Practice and Society, a new program announced in 2022.

In 2016, the Program for International Education and Social Change (PIESC) was introduced, which enables students from areas that are experiencing severe economic, social, and political crisis to access the liberal arts education offered by Bard College Berlin. The program continues a long tradition of humanitarian higher education work at Bard College, and in 2022 the college announced tuition scholarships for sixty displaced Ukrainian students.

Bard College Berlin provides an immersion in intellectual history from ancient Greece to the present day, with rigorous concentration on philosophy, economics, politics, literature, art history, film, and theater and studio arts. The total number of ECTS credits earned is 240. Study of the German language is offered through all levels and a level of B1 must be achieved before completion of the 4-year degree.

The college is, according to Martha Nussbaum, one of the educational institutions in Europe that makes the liberal arts idea into reality.

=== Special programs ===
==== L&T ====
This introductory course is offered during the three weeks prior to the official start of the fall semester. The Language and Thinking Program provides students with tools to write well at the university level, and to use writing as a resource throughout every stage of the learning process. The program seeks to unlock creativity, lift the pressures associated with academic work, and develop the skills needed for reading, understanding, and analysing visual, literary, and philosophical material. The program also provides strategies for the later stages of the writing process, including revising, editing, and consulting with peers and instructors.

==== One-year programs ====
The Academy Year (AY)

ECLA's first one-year program was introduced in 2002, and continues today in a developed version as the Academy Year Program. During the Academy Year, students take the first two core courses of the BA degree (Greek Civilization and Medieval Literature and Culture) and their choice of elective seminars. Students may also study languages.

The Project Year (PY)

Another one-year program, introduced in 2003, continues today as the Project Year Program. During this course of study, students pursue an individual project under the supervision of an ECLA of Bard faculty member with relevant expertise. In addition to their individual project, PY students take two core courses. The work culminates with a 25-page essay and an oral presentation of the project to the rest of the school.

=== Special programs ===
In addition to one-year and four-year programs, Bard College Berlin also offers the following special programs: Arts and Society in Berlin; LAB Berlin; and Begin in Berlin. Every summer, a Summer Theater Intensive is offered. Every semester, students from Bard College and other American liberal arts colleges study abroad at Bard College Berlin.

=== Faculty ===
Bard College Berlin brings together scholars and teachers from a variety of disciplines and backgrounds. Their main areas of expertise include philosophy, literature, political theory, art history, film theory, human rights, history, and rhetoric.

=== Guest teachers and visiting academics ===
In addition to faculty members and postdoctoral fellows, Bard College Berlin students are taught by a series of guest teachers, who deliver lectures and participate in seminars throughout the academic year.

=== Accreditation ===
As of January 20, 2017 Bard College Berlin is institutionally accredited at national level in Germany by the Wissenschaftsrat. The college first received state recognition from the Berlin Senate Department for Education, Youth and Science (Senatsverwaltung für Bildung, Jugend und Wissenschaft). Program accreditation for the BA program in Humanities, the Arts and Social Thought was granted by the accreditation agency ACQUIN in Fall 2013. The BA program in Economics, Politics, and Social Thought received accreditation in September 2015. Through its affiliation with Bard College, Annandale, Bard College Berlin and its degrees are accredited by the Middle States Commission on Higher Education (MSCHE).

== Campus ==
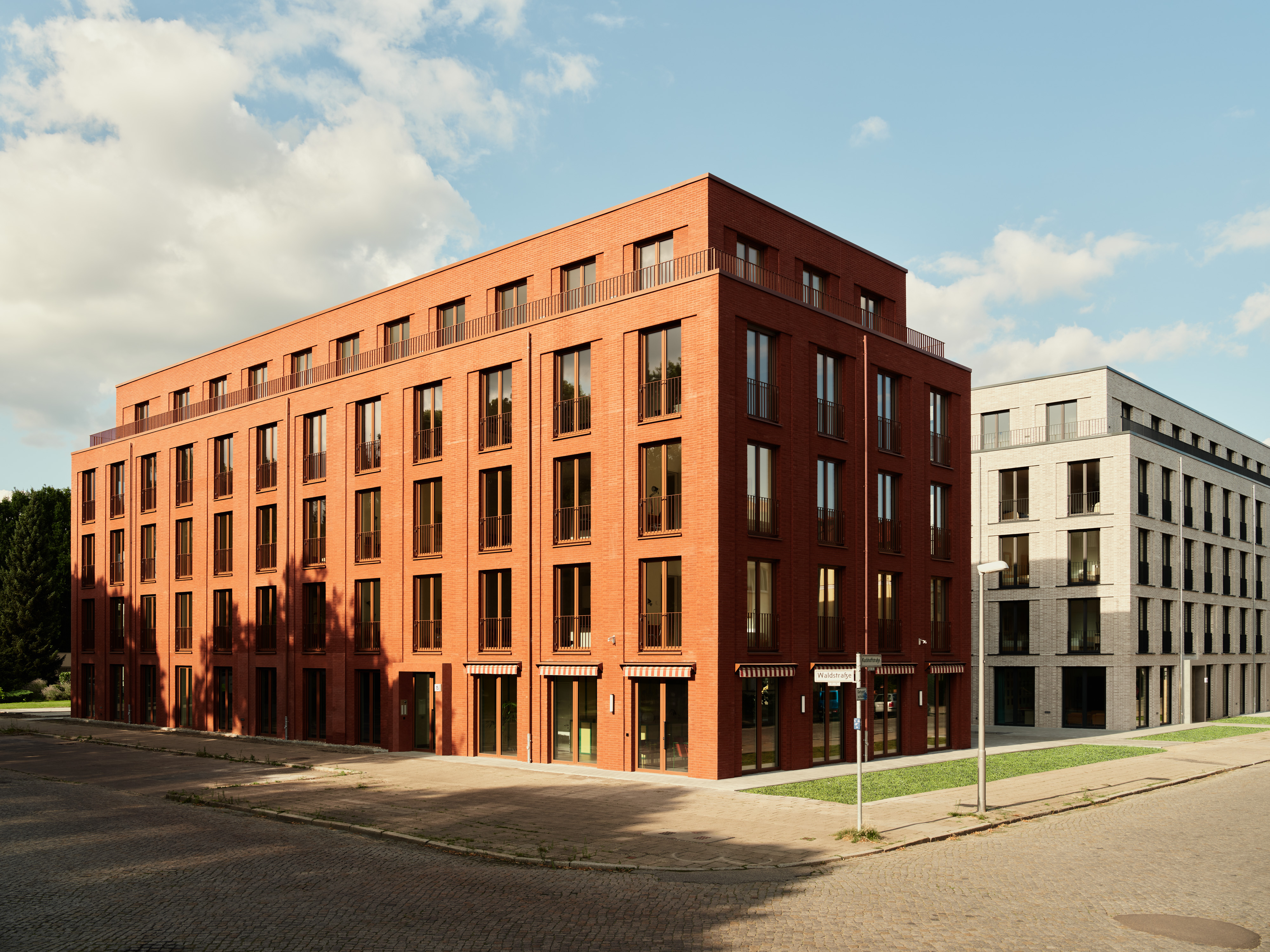
Bard College Berlin's Campus

Bard College Berlin is a residential college. The campus is located in the northern part of Berlin, in the residential area called Pankow-Niederschönhausen. Most buildings were designed in 1966 by Eckart Schmidt and built starting 1972, and formerly belonged to the embassies of several countries in GDR, among others Egypt, Cuba and Nigeria. Recent expansion of the campus has included:

- Henry Koerner Hall, apartment-style student housing (built 2018–19)
- The "KW" residence halls: K30 and Julie Johnson Kidd Hall, apartment-style student housing and study facilities (built 2019-2021)

For the design of K30 and Julie Johnson Kidd Hall (formerly known as W15), Bard College Berlin worked with New York City-based architecture firm Civilian, inspired by the city of Berlin's rich history of design and architecture in dialogue with the 1970s Neo-Bauhaus style.

Originally, in its first iteration ECLA was based in Berlin-Buch, from 1999 to 2002.

== See also ==
- Bard College
- Central European University
- Munich School of Philosophy
- Hertie School of Governance
