= University College Maastricht =

College in Maastricht, Netherlands

UCM
- University College Maastricht
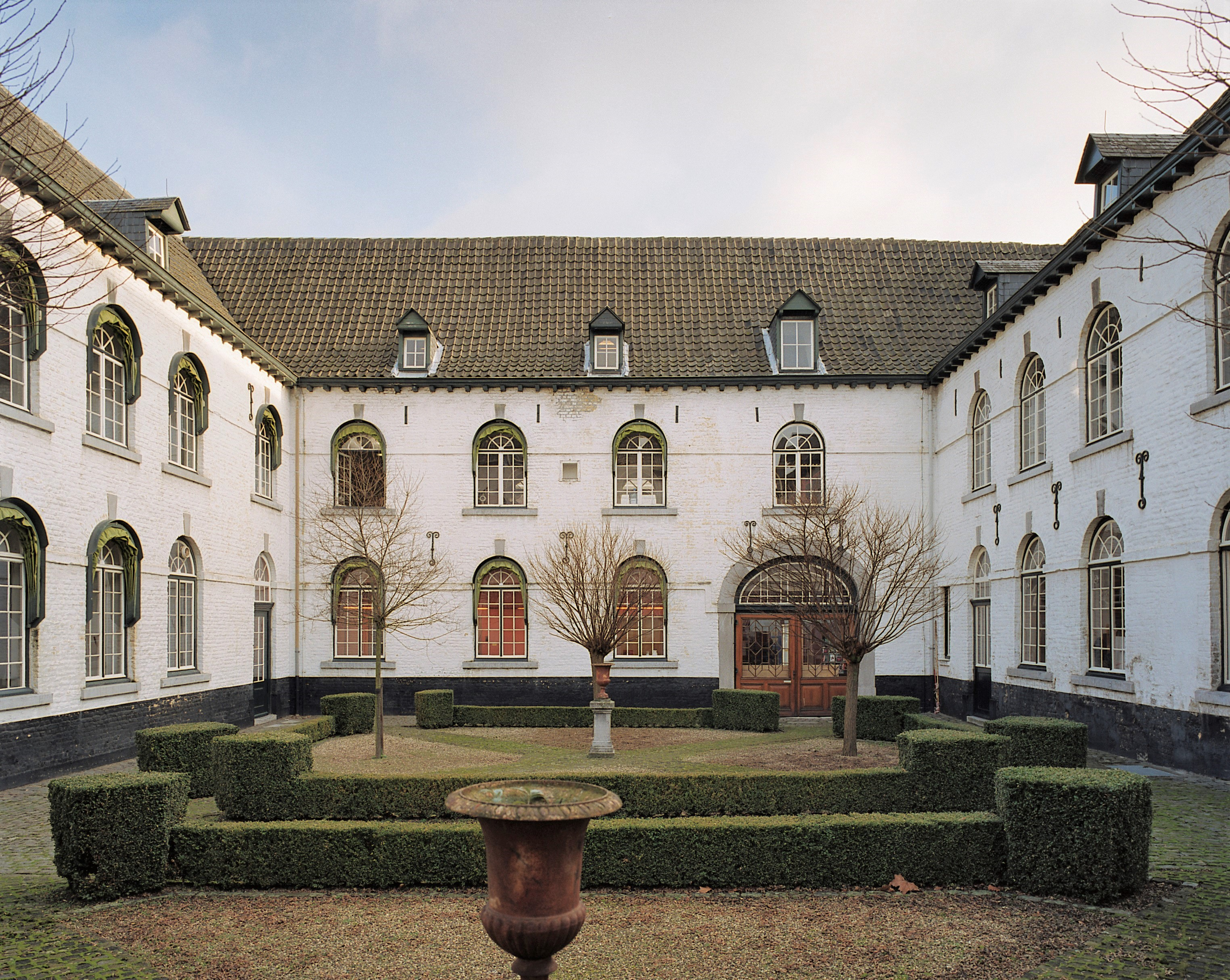
- Type: Public, Liberal arts and sciences college, Problem-based learning
- Established: 2002
- Dean: Dr. Wolfgang Giernalczyk
- Students: 800
- Location: Maastricht, Limburg, Netherlands 50.8443°N 5.6886°E
- Affiliations: Maastricht University
- Website: http://www.ucm.nl
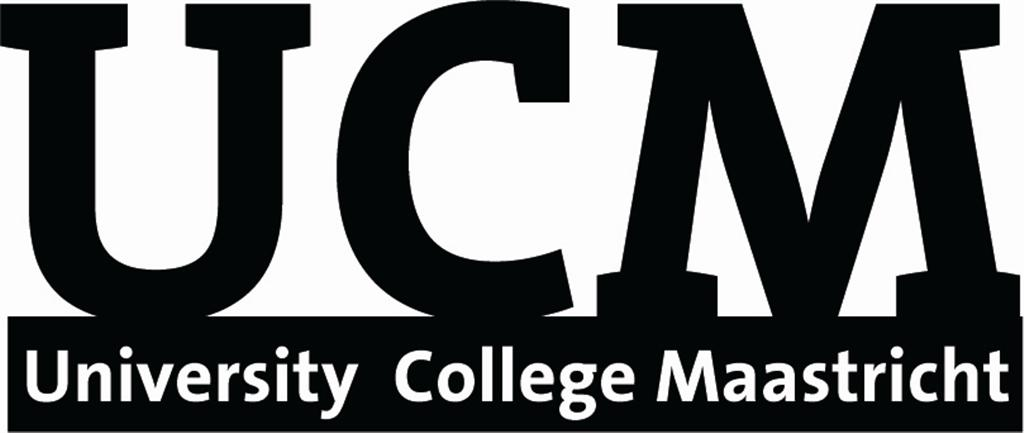

University College Maastricht (UCM) is an English language, internationally oriented, liberal arts and sciences college housed in the 15th century Nieuwenhof monastery in Maastricht, Netherlands. Founded in 2002, it is the second of its kind in the Netherlands. The college is part of Maastricht University (Dutch: Universiteit Maastricht) and offers a selective honours interdisciplinary programme.

The Dutch Higher Education Guide (Keuzegids Hoger Onderwijs) ranked UCM the best bachelors programme in the Netherlands in 2015 and 2016; in 2012, 2014 and 2015 they ranked UCM the best university college in the Netherlands. In 2012, 2013, 2014, 2016 and 2018 Elsevier Magazine ranked UCM the best university college in the Netherlands in terms of student satisfaction. It is a member of the European Colleges of Liberal Arts and Sciences.

== History ==
Maastricht University, of which UCM is part, was founded in 1976, making it one of the youngest universities in the Netherlands, and as of 2014 has over 16,000 students and roughly 3,600 employees. University College Maastricht itself opened in September 2002, before moving to a new location in 2006, and currently has over 800 students.

== Academics ==
Education at University College Maastricht, providing Bachelor of Arts and Bachelor of Science degrees, is fully taught in English. The College is a liberal arts college. Classes put an emphasis on independent learning via a group process structured through the Problem-based learning (PBL) method. The courses of the UCM programme are contained within three concentrations namely the humanities, sciences and social sciences. Of these students are required to choose one, although a combination of two is possible, in addition to a mandatory core curriculum and self-assembled general education, the latter picked from courses in a different concentration than the individual student's chosen concentration.

=== Concentrations ===
The Humanities concentration includes the academic disciplines of arts and media studies, cultural studies, European studies, history, literature, philosophy and science and technology studies. The Sciences concentration, previously known as Life Sciences, includes biology, chemistry, computer science, mathematics, physics and sustainable development. Finally, the Social Sciences concentration includes business administration, economics, international law, international relations, political science, psychology, public administration and sociology.

Courses are additionally structured in a 1000 to 3000-level grid, indicating an increasing level of complexity and necessary previous knowledge. In addition to courses, students are required to choose skills trainings including, but not limited to, argumentation, ethnography, languages and research methods. Thirdly, students are required to take one project, e.g. academic debating, per semester.

=== Curriculum structure ===
An individual student's curriculum consists of the previously mentioned courses, skills trainings and projects. With UCM using the European Credit Transfer and Accumulation System (ECTS) a BA or BSc at UCM will comprise a total of 180 ECTS. Students subsequently enrol in a maximum of 30 ECTS per semester, or 60 ECTS for a full year, with students receiving 5 ECTS for courses and projects and 2.5 ECTS for skills trainings. Students create their own curriculum, with help of academic advisors, by choosing courses located within their respective concentration in addition to a requirement to complete a core curriculum, consisting of four courses, and a general education requirement, consisting of two courses per concentration the student did not choose. The aim of this curriculum is to provide students with the opportunity to develop their own academic preferences and talents and acquire the expertise and skills to enter a Master programmes (see Admissions and Student Population).

=== International partnerships ===
Since its inception the college has established a number of international partnerships, allowing its students to participate in exchange programmes with subsequent study points counting towards their UCM degrees. Partner universities include University of Freiburg (including a flagship Double Degree Programme), University of California, Berkeley, Seoul National University, University College London and Sciences Po Lille.

== Location and building ==
After major renovations, UCM moved into the former Nieuwenhof convent in 2006. Located in the Jekerkwartier neighbourhood in central Maastricht, the building dates back to 1485 immediately adjacent to Maastricht's city fortifications. The 2000s (decade) renovation of the former convent included the creation of a common room, IT facilities and a reading room providing specific literature related to courses taught at the college.

UCM's Jekerkwartier location makes it part of the larger city centre campus of Maastricht University including its inner city library, School of Business, Law faculty and Graduate School of Governance.

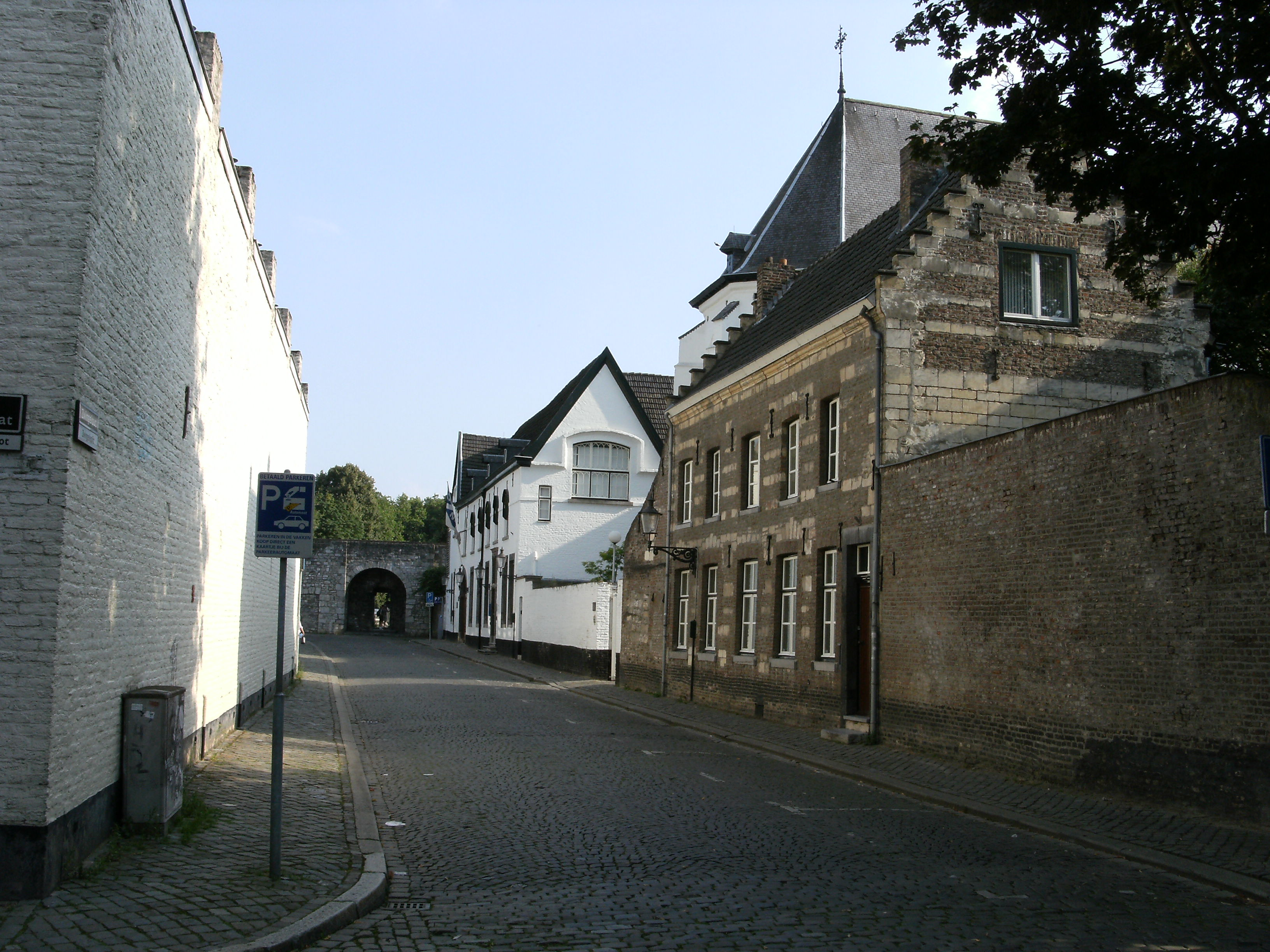
Zwingelput street

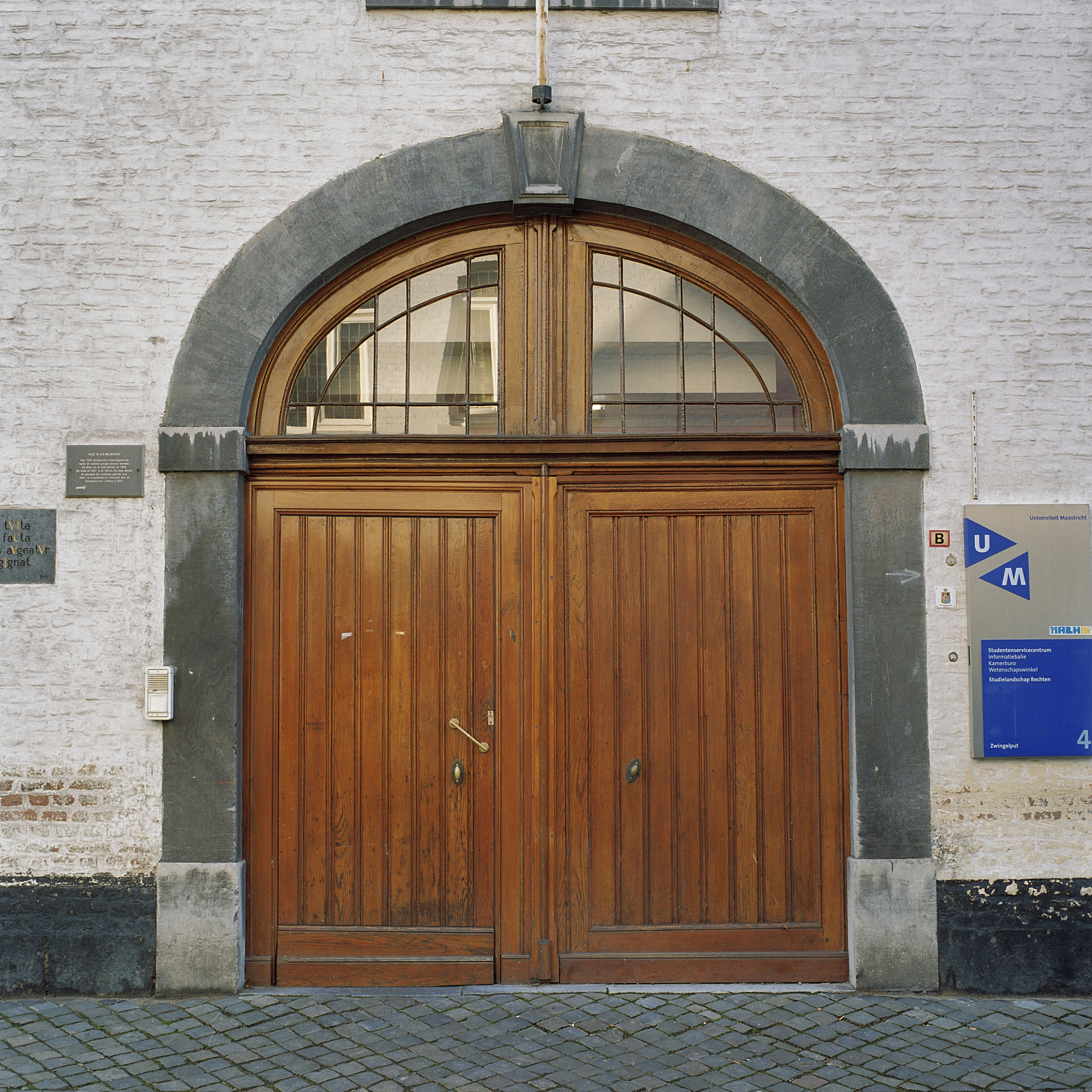
Entrance Zwingelput 4

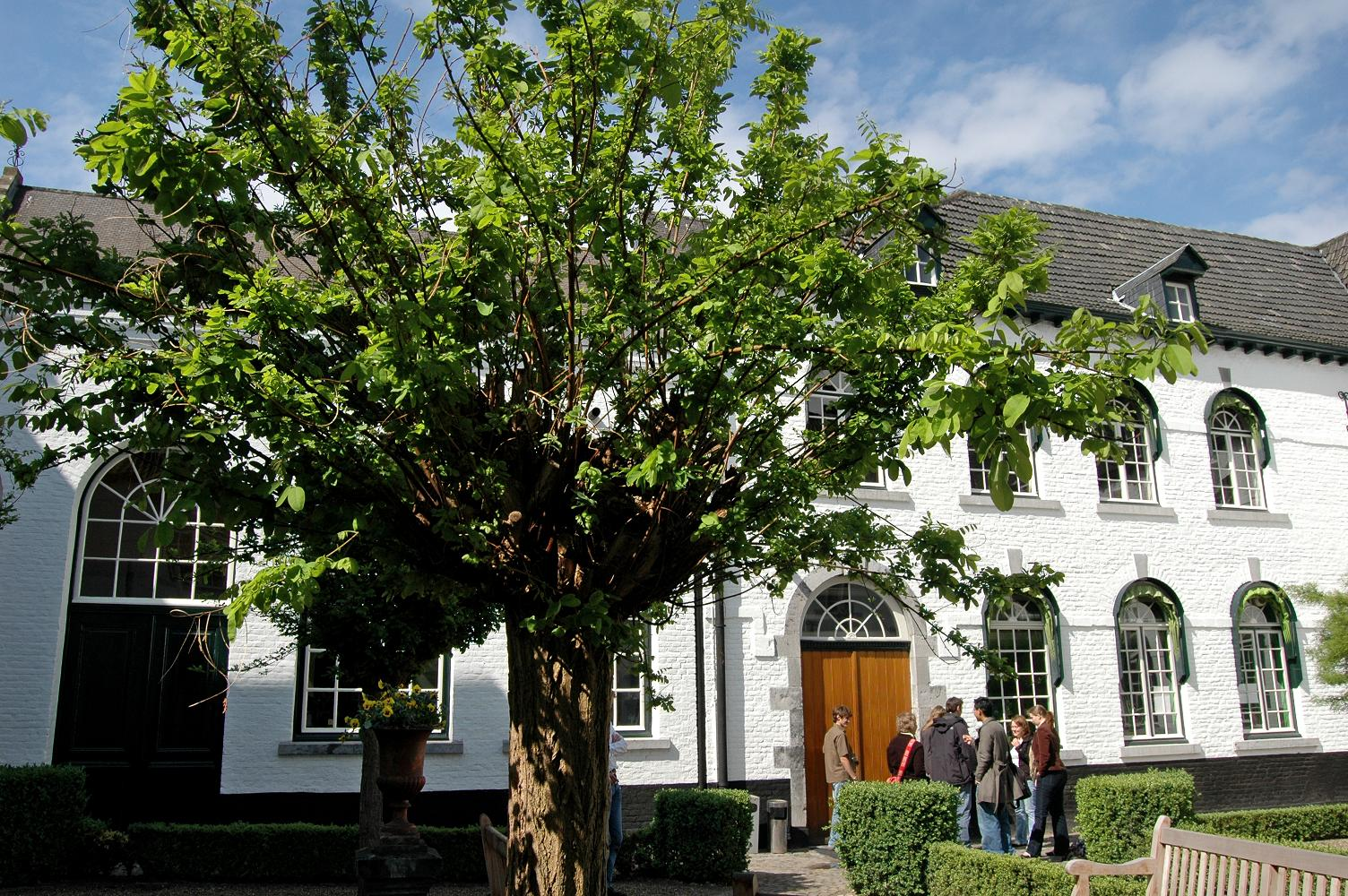
Courtyard

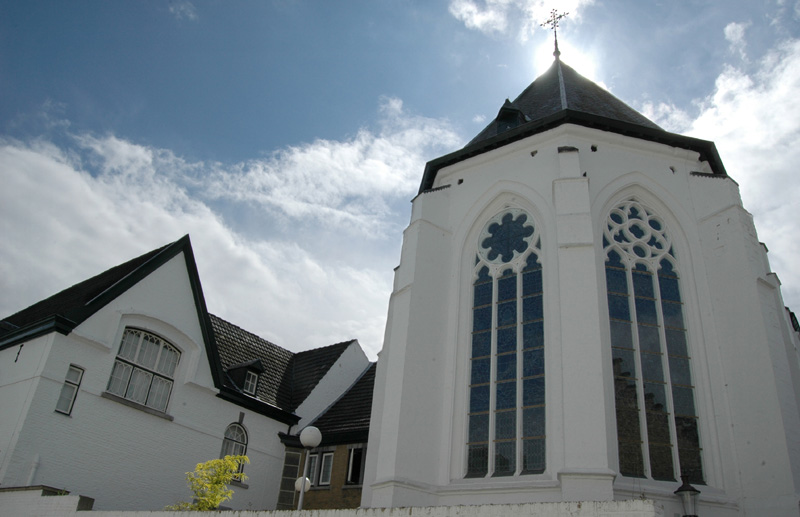
Chapel Nieuwenhof

== Admissions and student population ==
New students at UCM enroll in September. Compared to other undergraduate programs in the Netherlands, the admissions process is rigorous and extensive. New students are selected based on a letter of motivation, a CV, and an interview. The UCM student population includes about 50 different nationalities with approximately 70% of students originating outside the Netherlands. In recent years, 13.5% of applicants have gone on to study at UCM which is indicative of the highly competitive admissions process.

== Extracurricular activities ==
UCMSA Universalis is a multicultural and multidisciplinary study association directly affiliated with UCM. It is run by UCM students for UCM students. Universalis contributes to both academic and social life at UCM. The association is involved in the organization of parties, charity fundraisers, excursions, debates, student representation and many other events.
