= Smolny College =

Faculty of Liberal Arts and Sciences, St. Petersburg State University
- Факультет свободных искусств и наук СПбГУ
- Type: Liberal Arts
- Established: 1999
- Acting Dean: Nina Savchenkova
- Students: 700
- Location: Galernaya St. 58-60; St. Petersburg 190000; Russia, Saint Petersburg, Russia; 59°55′48.83″N 30°17′5.78″E
- Campus: Urban
- Website: www.artesliberales.spbu.ru
- Building details
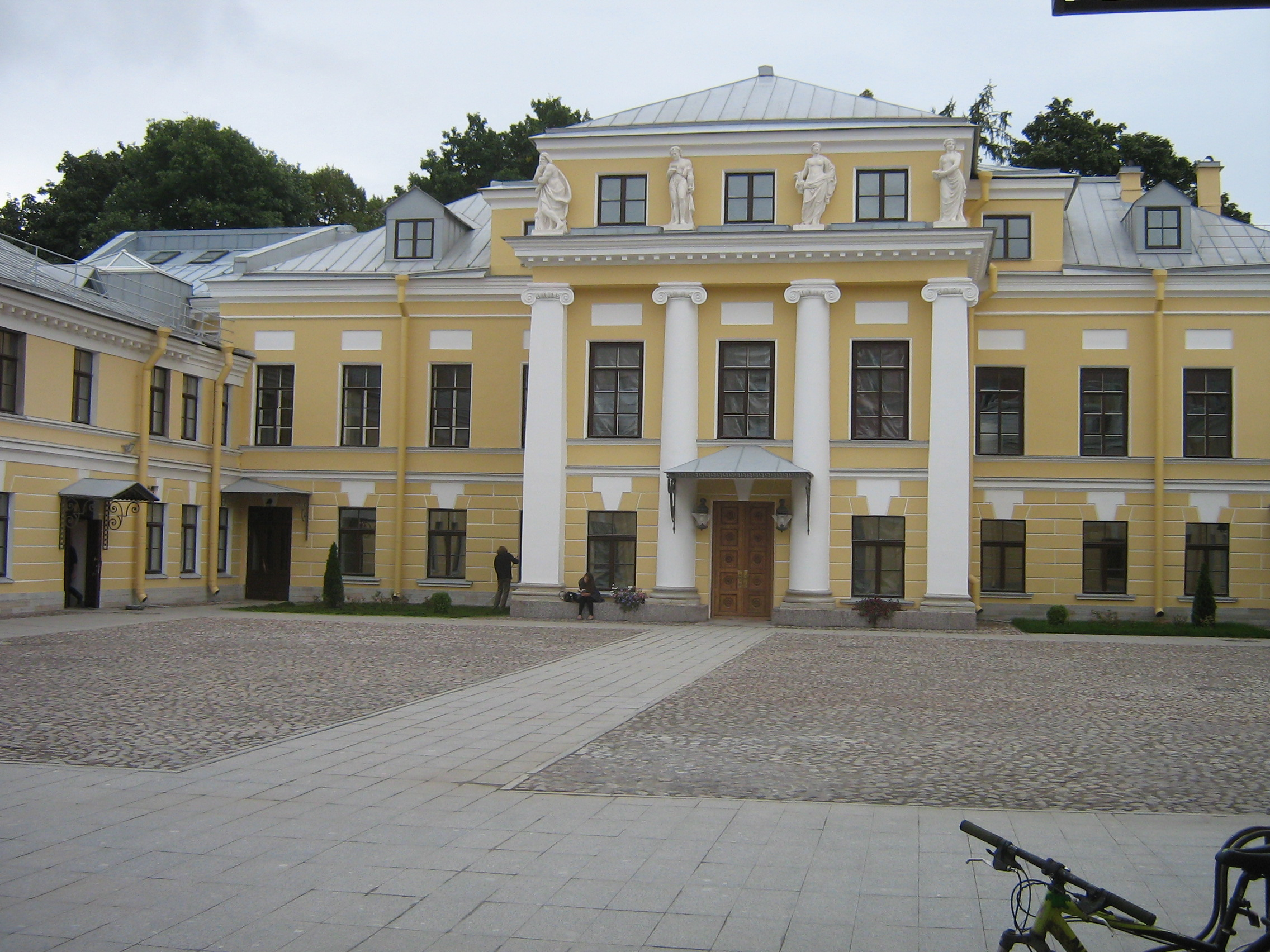

The Faculty of Liberal Arts and Sciences (formerly Smolny College) of Saint Petersburg State University (Russian: Факультет свободных искусств и наук СПбГУ) is the first Department in Russia (Saint Petersburg) to be founded upon the principles of liberal education.

== History ==
The Faculty of Liberal Arts and Sciences emerged from Smolny College (officially the Arts and Humanities Program), which was created in 1994 by Saint Petersburg State University in close collaboration with Bard College (U.S.). Bard College's interest in curricular innovation and the reform of international education coincided with the interests of a group of creatively-minded scholars from Saint Petersburg State University. In the fall of 1997 the Smolny Center announced a program of open courses to be attended by students from SPSU and other St. Petersburg universities. There are approximately 700 students enrolled in the Faculty. Up until 2021 Students who completed the four-year course received a B.A. in liberal arts both from Bard College and from Saint Petersburg State University.

In 2021, Bard College was declared to be "a threat to the fundamentals of the constitutional order and security of the Russian Federation" by the office of the Prosecutor-General of Russia. Saint Petersburg State University administrators subsequently announced their plan to terminate Smolny's long-term relationship with Bard College.

In October 2022, Saint Petersburg State University decided to discontinue educational program "Liberal Arts and Sciences", and from 2023 admissions onward has opened a new program in "Arts and Humanities" without any key feature of liberal arts approach. This has been perceived by the media as the beginning of the end of the department. The university has refuted these claims. Many faculty members have left the university, and some of them initiated Smolny Beyond Borders Project.
