= Bratislava International School of Liberal Arts =

Liberal arts college in Slovakia

Coordinates: 48°8′42.2″N 17°7′11.9″E

- Bratislavská medzinárodná škola liberálnych štúdií
- Type: Private liberal arts college
- Established: September 2006
- Location: Old Town, Bratislava, Slovakia
- Affiliations: European Colleges of Liberal Arts and Sciences (ECOLAS)
- Website: www.bisla.sk

The Bratislava International School of Liberal Arts (BISLA), located in the Old Town of Bratislava, Slovakia, is the first liberal arts college in Central Europe. A private, accredited three-year degree-granting undergraduate institution, it opened in September 2006.

It is a member of the European Colleges of Liberal Arts and Sciences.
