= Bartholomeus Assteyn =

Dutch painter

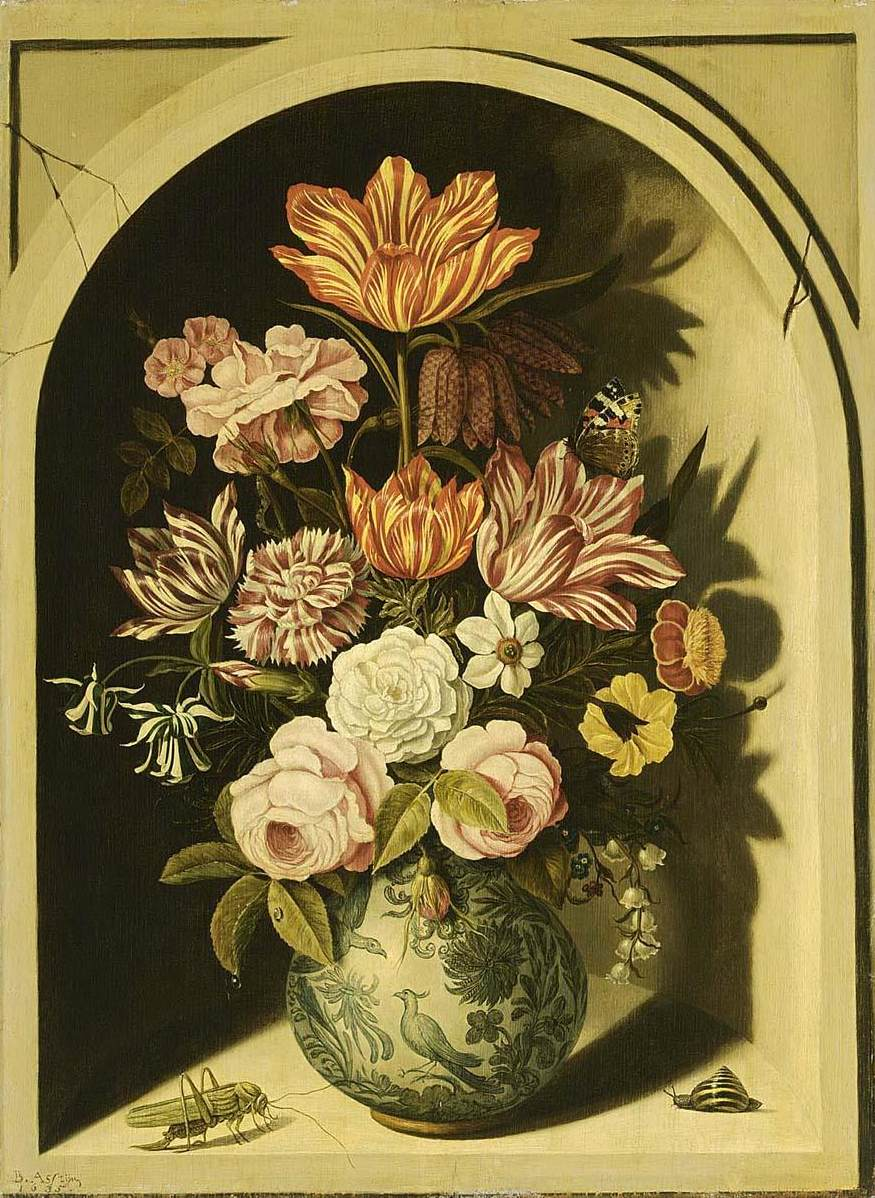
Still life by Bartholomeus Assteyn, private collection, 1635

Bartholomeus Abrahamsz. Assteyn (1607 in Dordrecht – 1669–1677 probably Dordrecht) was a Dutch painter. Bartholomeus Assteyn was the son of a painter from Ghent, Abraham Bartholomeusz. In the year 1631 he became a member in the Dordrecht's Saint Lukas painter guild. Assteyn lived with his family in Vriesestraat. In 1651 he was registered as an accountant for the local painter brotherhood. His exact death date is not known; his last authenticated work dates from the year 1669. Assteyn was a productive artist. Although he is not considered to be innovative, he created noteworthy still lifes. Assteyn's compositions are particularly affected by Johannes Bosschaert, and his painting technique is reminiscent of Balthasar van der Ast.
