= Abraham Bosschaert =

Dutch painter

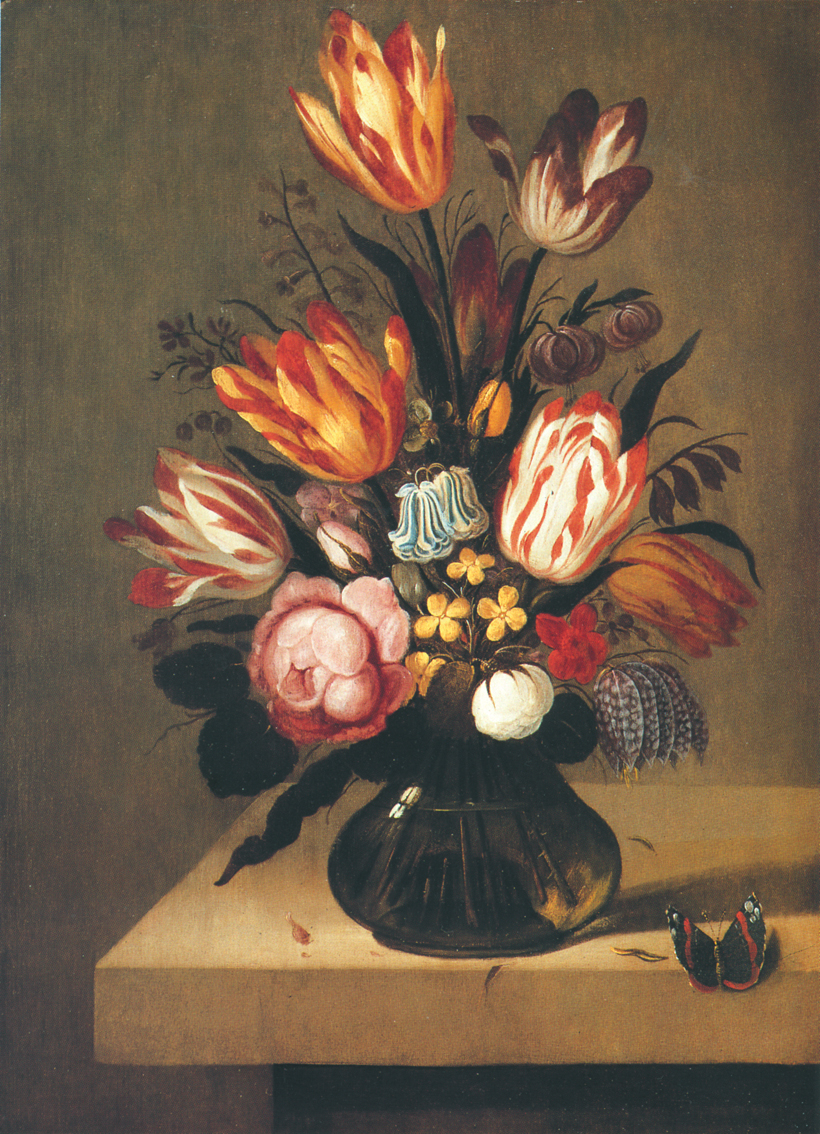
Bouquet of flowers with a butterfly on a stone slab

Abraham Bosschaert the Younger (II.) (c. 1612/1613–1643) was a Dutch Golden Age painter.

== Biography ==
Bosschaert was born in Middelburg. According to the RKD, he was a member of the Bosschaert dynasty. Like his father Ambrosius Bosschaert and older brothers, he signed his works with a monogram; AB, but this was only discovered in 1992. His older brothers Ambrosius Bosschaert II and Johannes Bosschaert were his first teachers after the death of his father in 1623, but he also took lessons from his uncle Balthasar van der Ast in Utrecht from 1628-1637. In 1637 he moved to Amsterdam, but by 1643 he had returned to Utrecht, where he was buried on April 4, 1643.
