= Ambrosius Bosschaert =

Dutch painter and art dealer

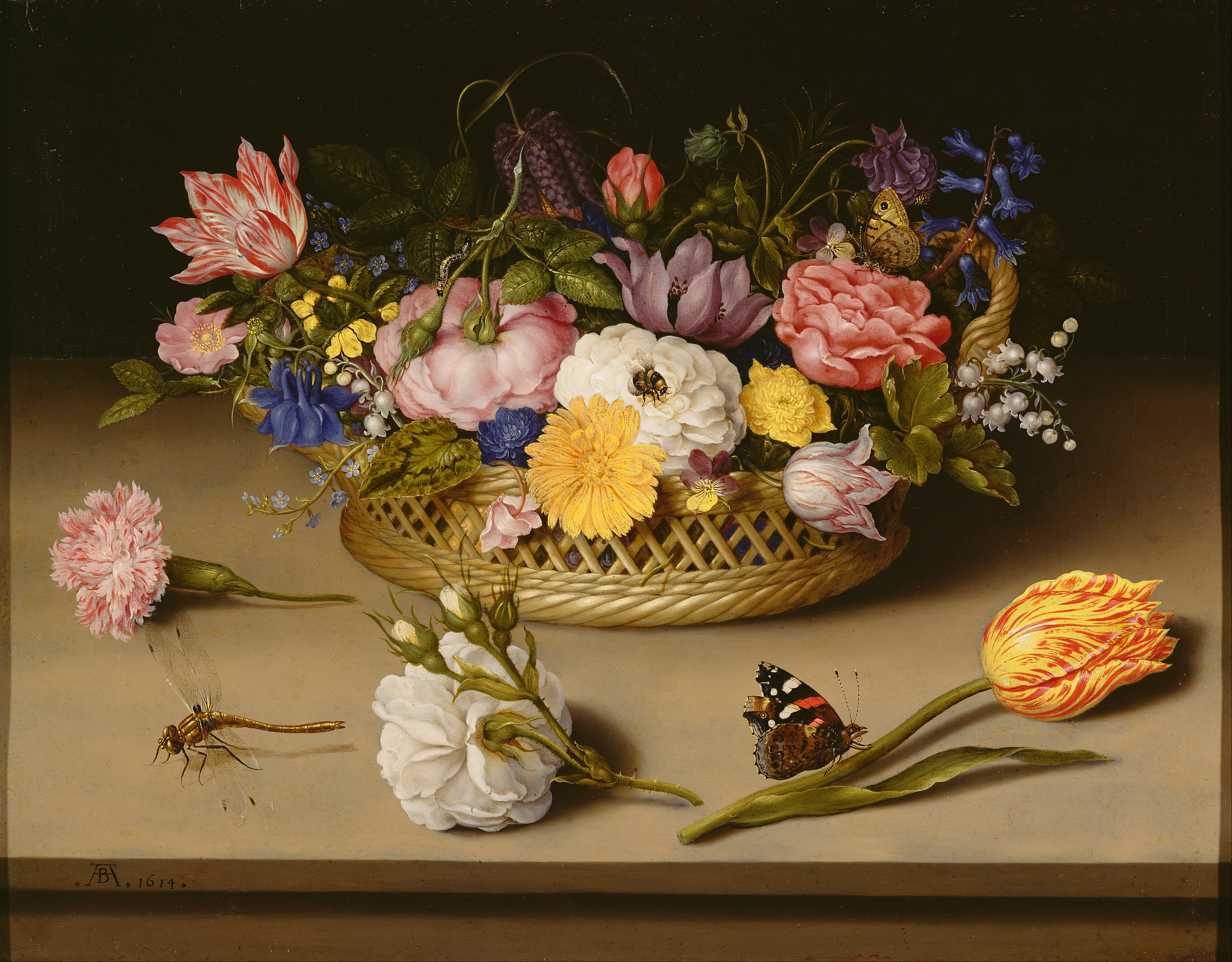
- Still-Life of Flowers, 1614, J. Paul Getty Museum, Los Angeles.
- Born: 18 January 1573; Antwerp
- Died: 1621 (aged 47–48); The Hague
- Known for: Painting
- Movement: Baroque

Ambrosius Bosschaert the Elder (18 January 1573 – 1621) was a Flemish-born Dutch still life painter and art dealer. He is recognised as one of the earliest painters who created floral still lifes as an independent genre. He founded a dynasty of painters who continued his style of floral and fruit painting and turned Middelburg into the leading centre for flower painting in the Dutch Republic.

== Biography ==
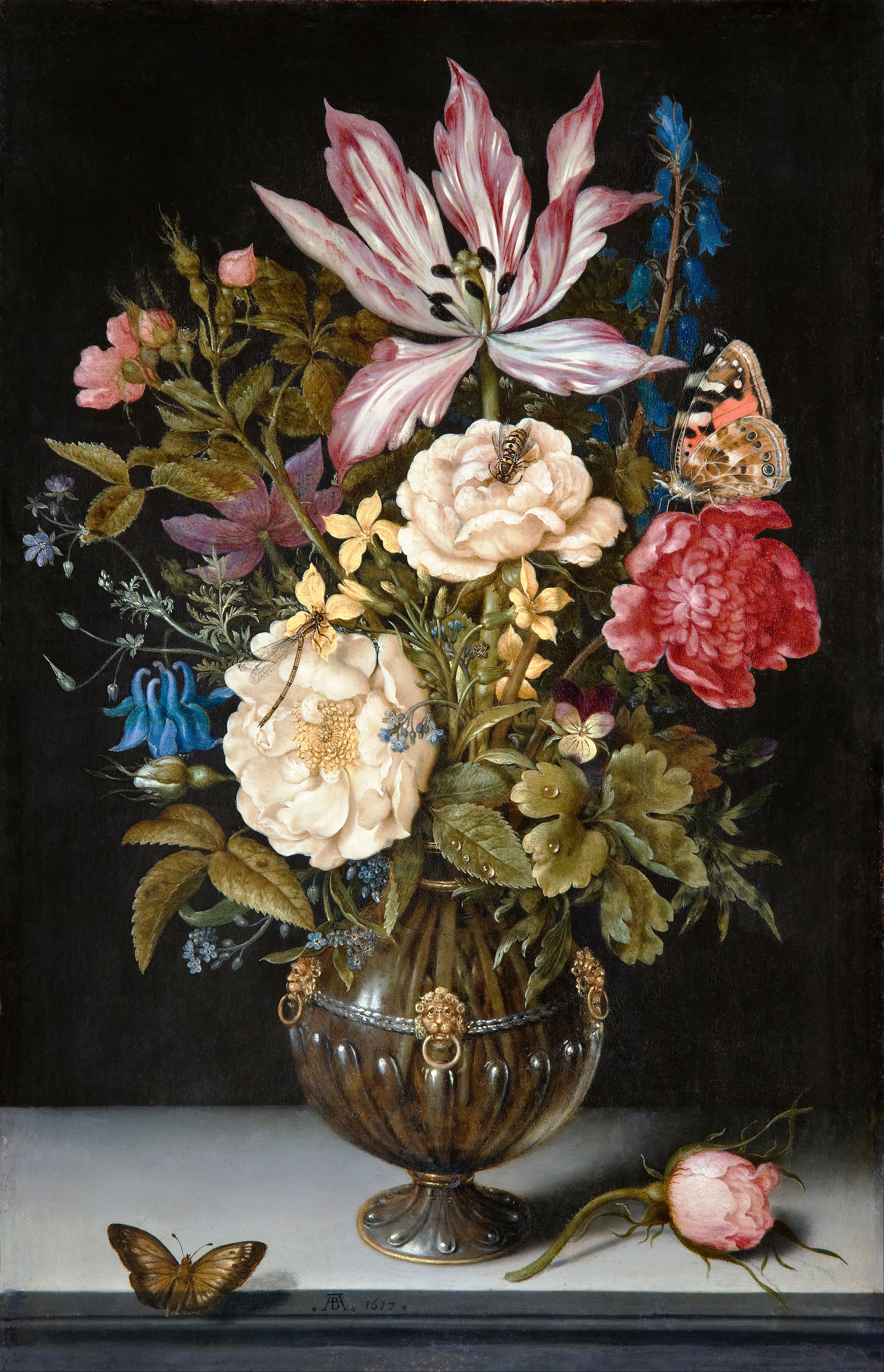
Still-Life with flowers, 1618, Hallwyl Museum, Stockholm.

He was born in Antwerp, where he started his career, but he spent most of it in Middelburg (1593–1613), where he moved with his family because of the threat of religious persecution. He specialized in painting still lifes with flowers, which he signed with the monogram AB (the B in the A). At the age of twenty-one, he joined the city's Guild of Saint Luke and later became dean. Not long after, Bosschaert married and established himself as a leading figure in the fashionable floral painting genre.

He had three sons who all became flower painters: Ambrosius II, Johannes and Abraham. His brother-in-law Balthasar van der Ast also lived and worked in his workshop and accompanied him on his travels. Bosschaert later worked in Amsterdam (1614), Bergen op Zoom (1615–1616), Utrecht (1616–1619), and Breda (1619). In 1619 when he moved to Utrecht, his brother-in-law van der Ast entered the Utrecht Guild of St. Luke, where the renowned painter Abraham Bloemaert had just become dean. The painter Roelandt Savery (1576–1639) entered the St. Luke's guild in Utrecht at about the same time. Savery had considerable influence on the Bosschaert dynasty.

After Bosschaert died in The Hague while on commission there for a flower piece, Balthasar van der Ast took over his workshop and pupils in Middelburg.

== Style ==
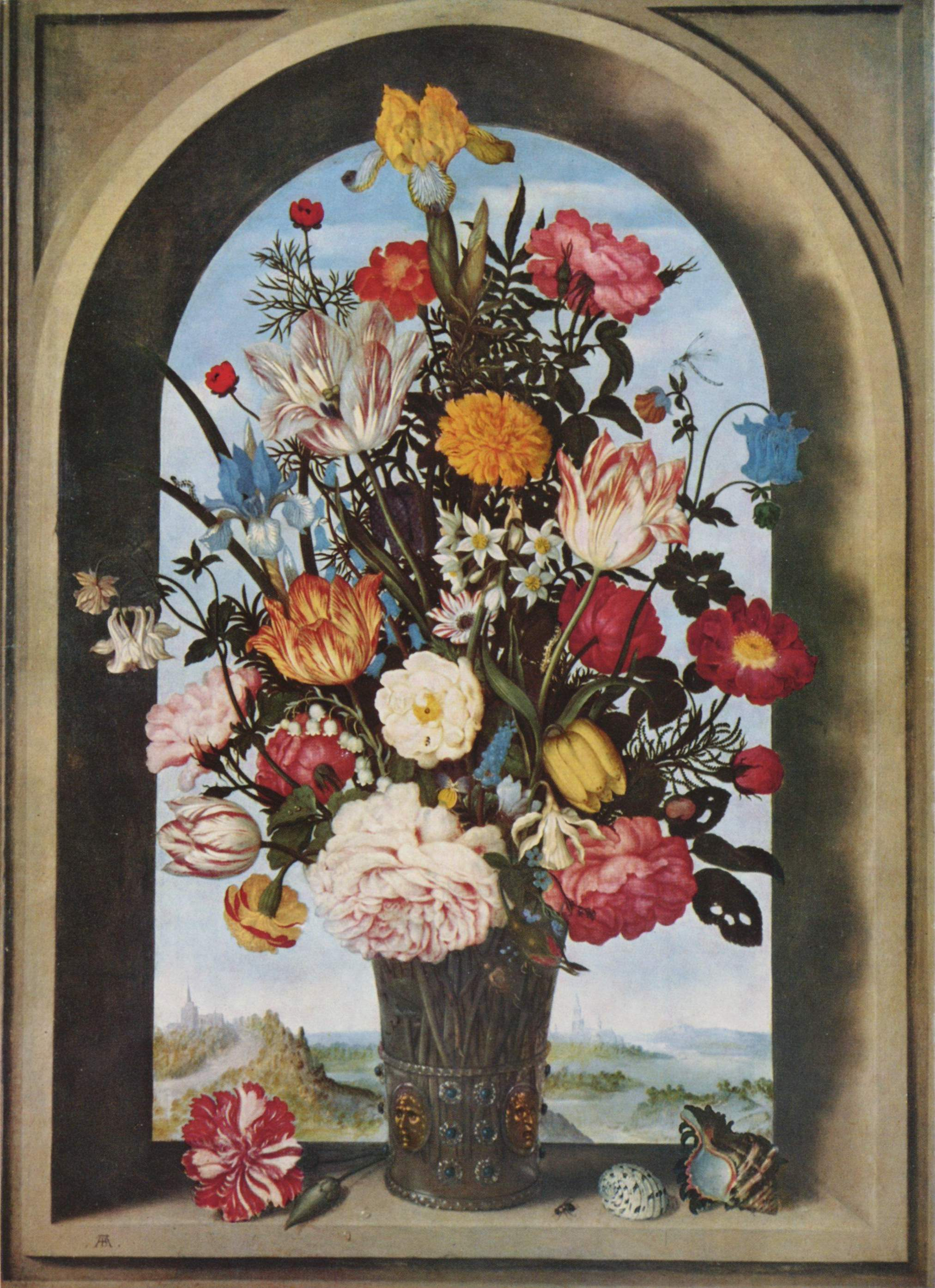
Vase of flowers in a window, 1618, Mauritshuis, The Hague.

His bouquets were painted symmetrically and with scientific accuracy in small dimensions and normally on copper. They sometimes included symbolic and religious meanings. At the time of his death, Bosschaert was working on an important commission in the Hague. That piece is now in the collection in Stockholm.

Bosschaert was one of the first artists to specialize in flower still life painting as a stand-alone subject. He started a tradition of painting detailed flower bouquets, which typically included tulips and roses, and inspired the genre of Dutch flower painting. Thanks to the booming seventeenth-century Dutch art market, he became highly successful, as the inscription on one of his paintings attests. His works commanded high prices although he never achieved the level of prestige of Jan Brueghel the Elder, the Antwerp master who contributed to the floral genre.

=== Legacy ===
His sons and his pupil and brother-in-law, Balthasar van der Ast, were among those to uphold the Bosschaert dynasty which continued until the mid-17th century.

It may not be a coincidence that this trend coincided with a national obsession with exotic flowers which made flower portraits highly sought after.

Although he was highly in demand, he did not create many pieces because he was also employed as an art dealer.

== Bibliography ==
- Pennisi, Meghan Siobhan Wilson (2007). The flower still -life painting of Ambrosius Bosschaert the Elder in Middelburg, ca. 1600–1620 (PhD thesis). Evanston, Illinois: Department of Art History, Northwestern University.
- Wheelock, Arthur K. (24 April 2014). "Bosschaert, Ambrosius Dutch, 1573–1621" (PDF). Collection: Artists. National Gallery of Art. Archived (PDF) from the original on 9 October 2022.
- "Bosschaert de Oudere, Ambrosius". Winkler Prins encyclopedia (8 ed.). 1975.
- Stechow, Wolfgang (1966). "Ambrosius Bosschaert: Still Life". The Bulletin of the Cleveland Museum of Art. 53 (3): 61–65. JSTOR 25152092.
