= Middelburg Town Hall =

15th-century building in the Netherlands

Coordinates: 51.4989°N 3.6108°E

Middelburg Town hall
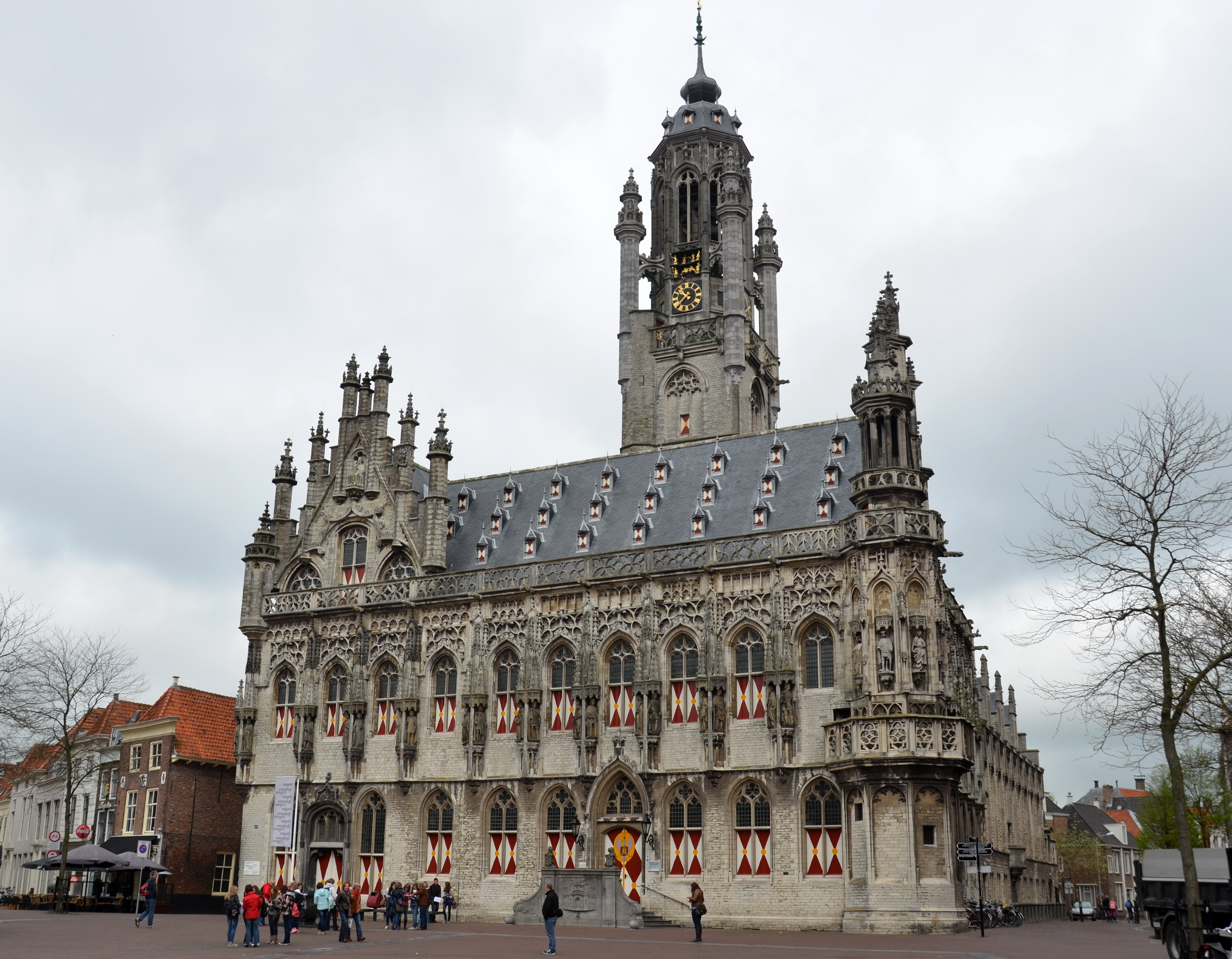
- Interactive map of the Middelburg Town hall area

General information
- Status: University building, Wedding venue
- Architectural style: Late Gothic
- Location: Middelburg, Zeeland, Netherlands
- Construction started: 15th century
- Completed: 16th century

Middelburg Town Hall is situated at the market of Middelburg, Zeeland. It is considered one of the finest Gothic buildings in the Netherlands. Construction began in 1452 and was supervised by several generations of the Flemish family of architects Keldermans. It was completed in 1520, the town hall included a facade with Gothic windows, red-white shutters, smaller turrets and twenty-five statues of Zeeland's counts and countesses. The building has one main tower, which the Middelburgers call 'Malle Betje'. This mocking name comes from the fact it used to run behind the town's other clock tower, the 'lange Jan'. A meat-auction or 'meathall' used to be situated in the building, which had a separate entrance. Whereas the town hall itself is still used for weddings, since 2004 its spaces are in use by the University College Roosevelt, the local university. The former meat hall has been in use as an exhibition space for the SBKM since 1980.

== Statues ==
The statues on the facades represented counts and countesses of the province of Zeeland. They were painted in bright colors, especially in red and blue, the crowns being partially goldened. The series of statues starts at the left with Count Dirk V, who ruled from 1061 to 1091. The series ends with Emperor Charles V (1506-1555). The ruler at the date of completion, Philip II (1555-1598) is not included, even though a pedestal in reserved for him. This is most likely due to the war he waged with the Netherlands from 1569 onwards.

== Reconstruction ==
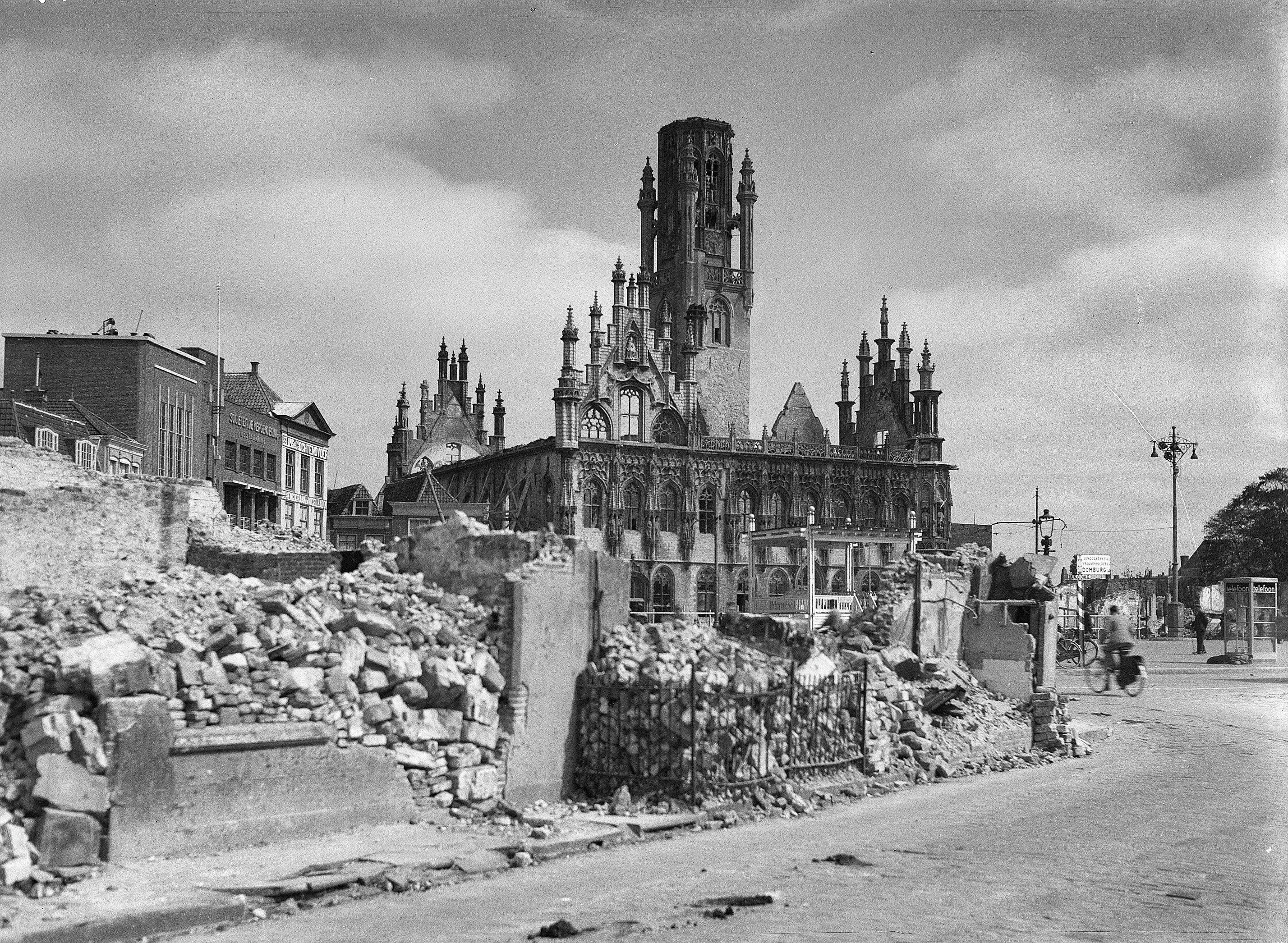
Town hall in June 1940

The town hall's interiors burnt down entirely on May 17, 1940 during the bombardments in the Second World War. Like most of the old town center of Middelburg, the town hall suffered the German bombardments. Old paintings and documents were lost, only the exterior remained. A large restorative campaign started, which lasted till late in the 20th century. It was decided to restore the Gothic facades, and to add a new building into the interiors, in a style fitting with the traditional Gothic building. The architects H. van Heeswijk from The Hague and M. J. J. van Beveren supervised this reconstruction.

== See also ==
- 16th-century Western domes
