= Ambrosius Bosschaert II =

Dutch Golden Age painter

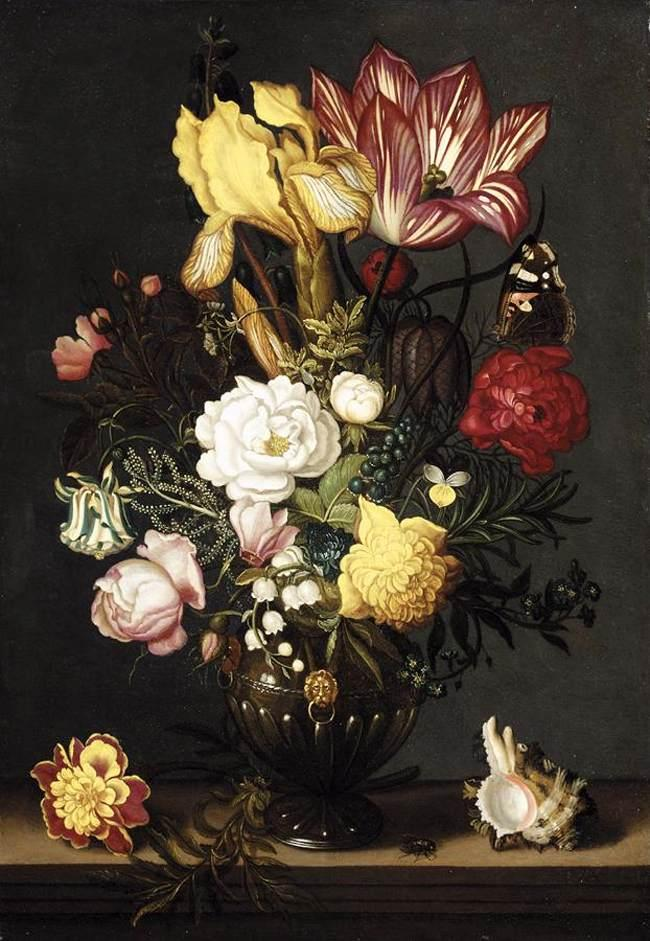
Still life

Ambrosius Bosschaert II (1609–1645) was a Dutch Golden Age painter who specialized in flower paintings in the manner of his father Ambrosius Bosschaert.

== Biography ==
Bosschaert was born in Arnemuiden, near Middelburg in 1609. He wrote his signature as a monograph in Gothic Script until 1631, when he began signing as ABosschart, again changing in 1633, when he began using more round letters. After 1634, he used his full name. Because of this, he is confused with his father and his brother Abraham Bosschaert. Bosschaert's work was only recognized in 1935. He was also heavily influenced by his uncle Balthasar van der Ast. His brothers Johannes Bosschaert and Abraham Bosschaert also became flower painters. In 1634, he married Maria Struys and died in Utrecht in 1645.

His compositions were compact and had dark backgrounds. He used grays, browns, blues, yellows, and white highlights.
