= Johannes Bosschaert =

Dutch painter

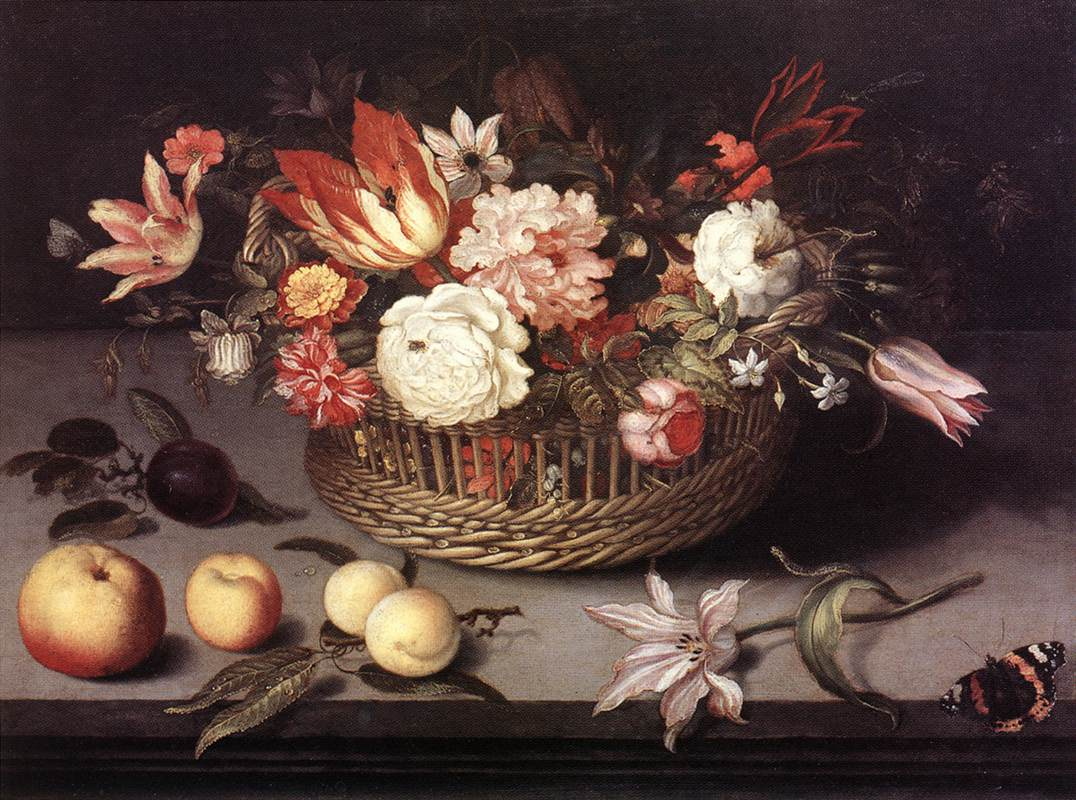
Basket of Flowers, oil on panel, 1627, is the latest work extant by Johannes Bosschaert

Johannes Bosschaert (1606/08– 1628/29) was a member of the Bosschaert family of still life painters.

== Biography ==
He was born in Middelburg, one of the three sons of Ambrosius Bosschaert, who painted flowers in a similar style. His brothers Ambrosius and Abraham also became flower painters. He moved with his family and uncle Balthasar van der Ast to Bergen op Zoom in 1615, and moved with them again in 1619 to Utrecht, but after his father died in 1621, Johannes became a member of the Haarlem Guild of St. Luke in 1623 and paid membership until 1625. In 1626 he moved south again and became a member of the Dordrecht Guild of St. Luke. He influenced his younger brother Abraham and the Dordrecht painter Jacob Gerritsz Cuyp. Like his father and brothers, he signed his works with a monogram; JB. He died in Dordrecht; the precise date of his death is unknown.
