= AIC =

AIC may refer to:

== Arts and entertainment ==
- Alice in Chains, American rock band
- Alice in Chains: AIC 23, a 2013 mockumentary
- Anime International Company, a Japanese animation studio
- Art Institute of Chicago, an art museum in Chicago
- Académie Internationale de la Céramique (International Academy of Ceramics)
- An Inspector Calls, a 1945 play by J. B. Priestley
- Association of International Champions; List of Barbershop Harmony Society quartet champions

== Business ==
- American Investment Council, formerly known as PEGCC, US trade association for the private equity and growth capital investment industry
- Asia Internet Coalition, an internet trade group in Asia
- Association of Investment Companies, also known as The Association of Investment Trust Companies, UK trade association for closed-ended investment companies

== Charitable organizations ==
- Advocates for Informed Choice, now called Interact Advocates for Intersex Youth, a U.S. NGO
- Alternative Information Center, a joint Palestinian-Israeli NGO
- American Indian Center, social and cultural center
- American Institute for Conservation, an American organization devoted to preserving historic works

== Computing ==
- Adaptec integrated circuit
- Add-in card, or expansion card, a circuit board that adds functionality to a computer
- Apple Intermediate Codec, a video codec used on OS X

== Economics ==
- Actual Individual Consumption, a measure of economic well-being alternative to Gross Domestic Product

== Politics and government ==
- State Administration for Industry and Commerce, a Chinese regulatory agency
- African Independent Congress, a South African political party
- Arab–Israeli conflict, a long-running conflict between Israel and Arab countries
- American Iranian Council, a think tank devoted to improving US–Iranian relations
- Association Internationale du Congo, an organization promoting Leopold II's rule of the Congo and predecessor to the Congo Free State, active from 1879 to 1885
- Australian Intelligence Community, the government agencies that make up Australia's intelligence operations

== Philosophy ==
- Animal–industrial complex, a term describing systematic and institutionalized exploitation of animals

== Religion ==
- African Initiated Church, a Christian church founded by Africans, also known as African Independent Church, African Indigenous Church or African Instituted Church
- Africa Inland Church, a church in Eastern Africa related to Africa Inland Mission
- American Islamic Congress, an American Muslim organization
- Answers In Creation, an organization promoting Old Earth creationism

== Schools ==
- Academia de la Inmaculada Concepción, a Catholic school in Mayagüez, Puerto Rico
- Alcanta International College, a private secondary school in Guangzhou, China
- American International College, a college in Springfield, Massachusetts, US
- American Islamic College, a college in Chicago, US
- Arizona International College, a former public college in Arizona, US
- Art Institute of Colorado, a university in Denver, US
- Associated Independent Colleges, a group of eight colleges in Queensland, Australia
- Auckland International College, a private secondary school in Auckland, New Zealand
- Australian Indigenous College, a former business college in Queensland, Australia
- Dwight D. Eisenhower School for National Security and Resource Strategy, formerly known as the Army Industrial College

== Science ==
- Akaike information criterion, estimates the quality of a statistical model, relative to other models
- American Institute of Chemists, an American chemistry organization
- Ampere Interrupting Capacity, the maximum safe fault current in a circuit breaker
- AIC (gene), which encodes the Aicardi syndrome protein
- Australian Institute of Criminology, an Australian research center on crime

== Sports ==
- Anglo-Italian Cup, a football competition played from 1970 to 1996 between the UK and Italy
- Arkansas Intercollegiate Conference, a former college athletic conference competing in the National Association of Intercollegiate Athletics, all members competed in the state of Arkansas
- Associazione Italiana Calciatori (Italian Footballers' Association), a football association in Italy

== Statistics/Machine Learning ==
- Akaike information criterion, a measure of the relative quality of a statistical model, for a given data set

== Transport and military ==
- Action Information Center, the tactical center on a warship or aircraft
- Air India, an Indian airline (ICAO designator AIC)
- Ammunition Identification Code, Ordnance Supply Catalog designation for ammunition used by the US Army Ordnance Corps from 1942 to 1958; see List of U.S. Army munitions by supply catalog designation
- Australian Instructional Corps, military unit, Australia

== Other uses ==
- Adult In Custody, an acronym used to describe incarcerated people, especially in the context of penal labor
- Aichach-Friedberg, a district in Bavaria, Germany
- Alternative Information Center, joint Palestinian-Israeli NGO
- Association Internationale de la Couleur (International Colour Association), an organization that studies colour
