= Carlyle Begay =

American politician

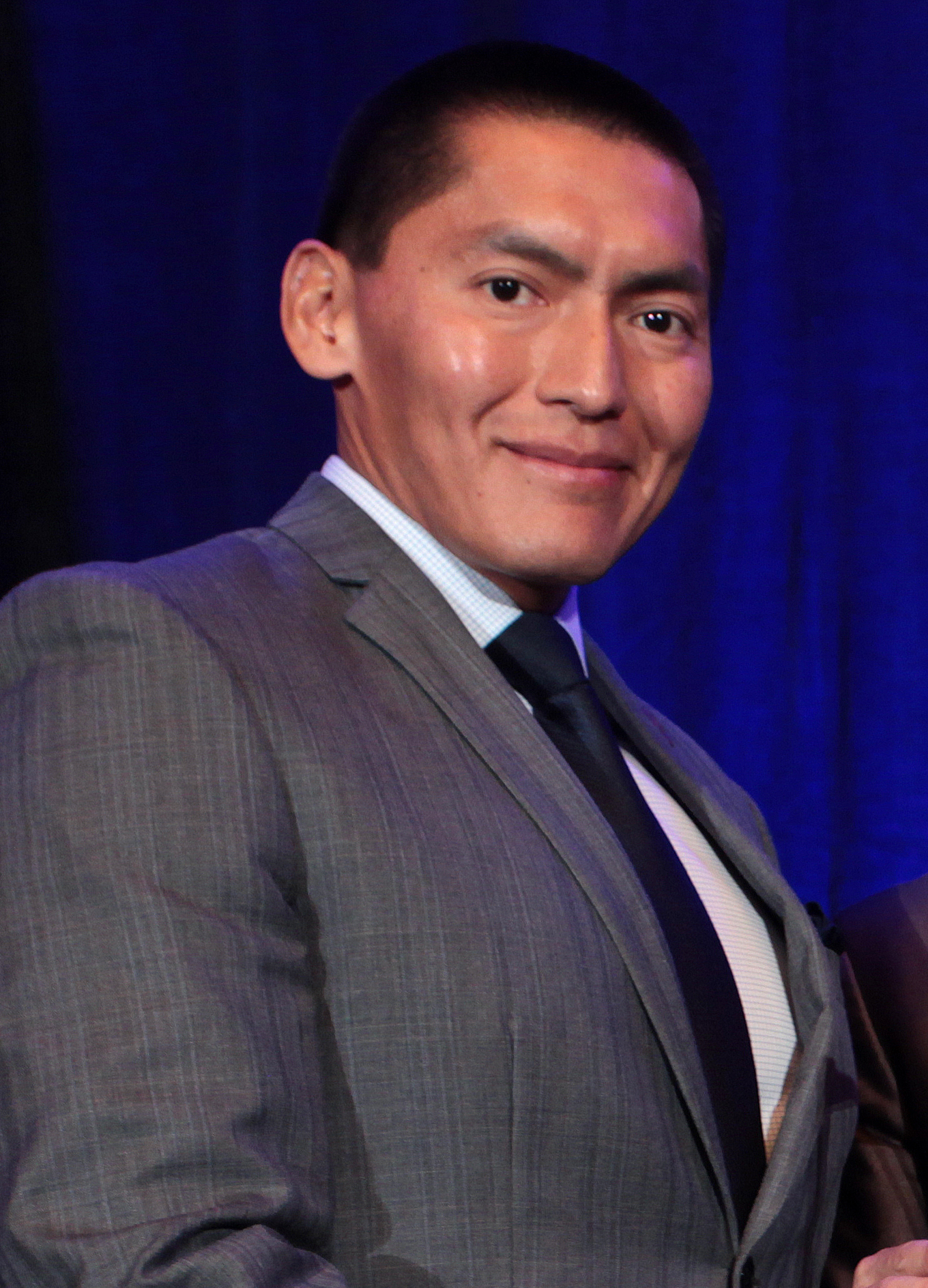

Member of the Arizona Senate from the 7th district
- In office July 1, 2013 – January 9, 2017
- Preceded by: Jack Jackson, Jr.
- Succeeded by: Jamescita Peshlakai

Personal details
- Born: Tuba City, Arizona, U.S.
- Party: Democratic (until 2015); Republican (2015–present)
- Spouse(s): Candace Begody-Begay (divorced); Chantelle K. Begay (2021–present)
- Children: 1
- Education: University of Arizona

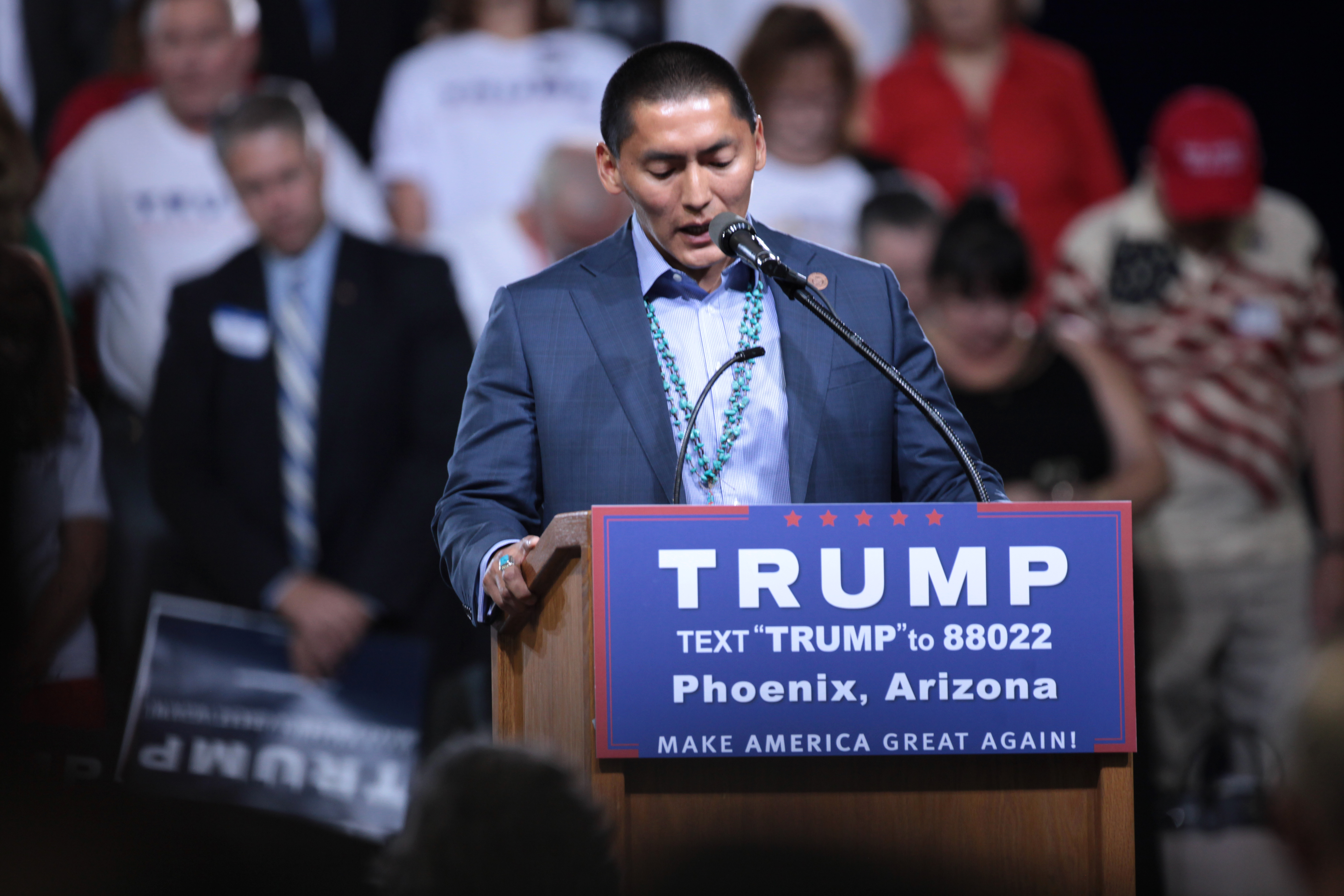
Begay speaking at a campaign rally for Donald Trump, June 2016

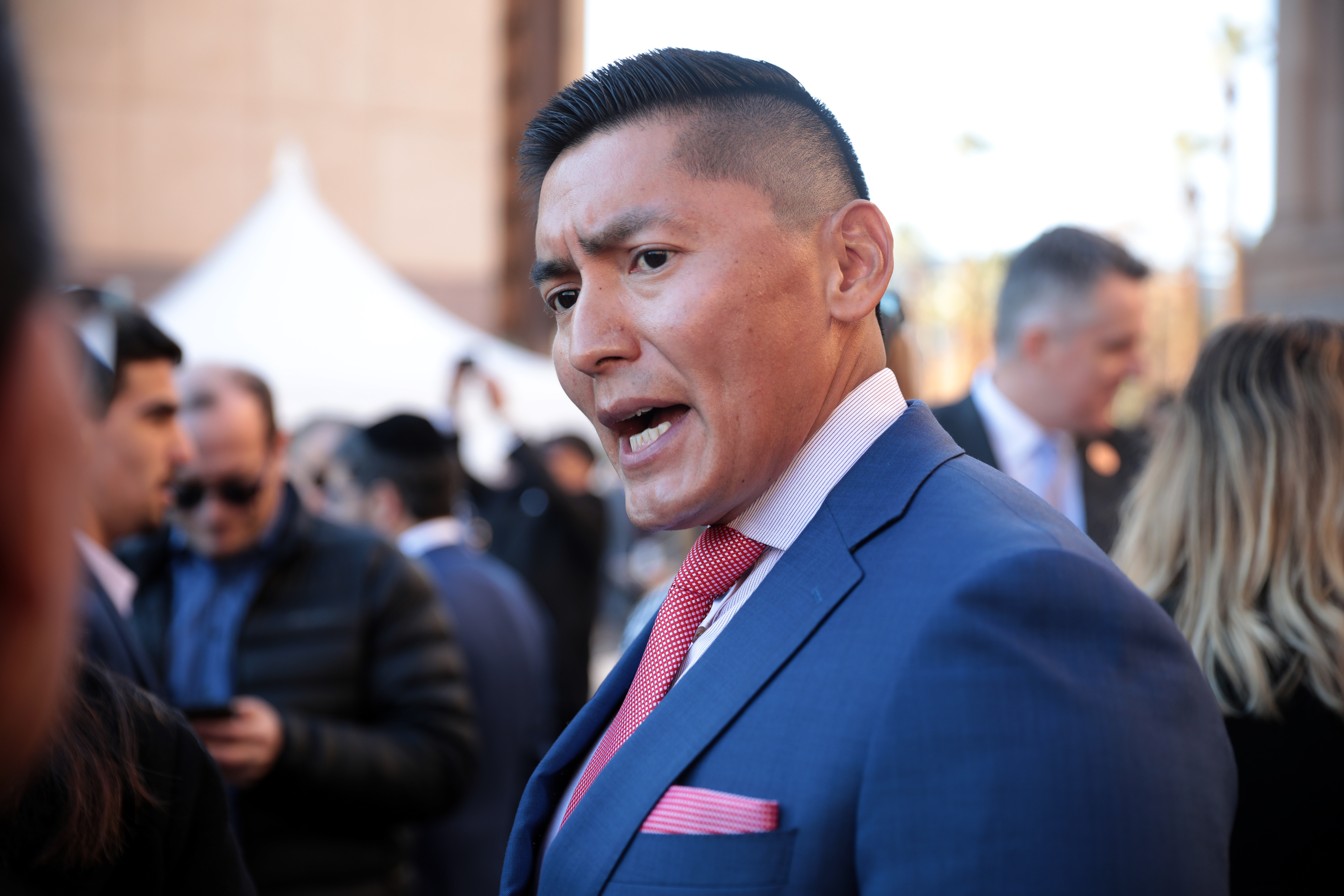
Begay speaking with attendees at the 2019 Inauguration of Governor Doug Ducey at the Arizona State Capitol building in Phoenix, 2019

Carlyle W. Begay is a Diné-American politician. A member of the Republican Party, he represented the seventh district in the Arizona State Senate which is the largest Legislative State District in the Continental United States.

== Early life ==
Begay is Navajo and was born on the Navajo Nation and he is Tó’tsohnii (Big Water), born for Kinyaa’áanii (Towering House) clans. His maternal grandparents are Tl'izi lani (Many Goats clan). His paternal grandparents are also of the Tl'izi lani (Many Goats clan). Begay is a lifetime resident of Arizona and grew up on the Navajo Nation near Black Mesa and was raised under the teachings of his ancestry, instilling in him the importance of remembering the story of his people and carrying it on to his descendants.

Begay graduated from the University of Arizona with a Bachelor of Science degree in Molecular and Cellular Biology and was a student in the Minority Medical Education Program at the University of Arizona College of Medicine. He also attended the Arizona International College's Natural Sciences and Mathematics program in Tucson, Arizona; Johns Hopkins Bloomberg School of Public Health's Winter Institute, in Baltimore, Maryland; and the Harvard School of Public Health's Public Health Studies program in Boston, Massachusetts.

== Political career ==
Begay succeeded Jack Jackson, Jr. in the Arizona State Senate in 2013 after Jackson resigned to join the Obama Administration. On November 23, 2015, Begay announced that he switched from the Democratic Party to the Republican Party. He ran for Congress in the 2016 elections but withdrew and endorsed Pinal County Sheriff Paul Babeu who subsequently lost to Democrat Tom O'Halleran After that year's elections, he claimed to have secured a position in the Trump White House but subsequently acknowledged he only volunteered his time to the administration's transition efforts.

In October 2020, he joined Navajo Nation Vice President Myron Lizer, Donald Trump Jr. and others in launching the Native Americans for Trump coalition in Williams, Arizona. He served as the co-chair of the Native Americans for Trump 2020 coalition, together with fellow Navajo Sharon Clahchischilliage.
