= Online Safety Act (Sri Lanka) =

2024 Sri Lankan legislation

Online Safety Act, No. 9 of 2024

Parliament of Sri Lanka
- Long title: An Act to establish the Online Safety Commission; to provide safety from prohibited statements made online; to prevent the use of online accounts and inauthentic online accounts for prohibited purposes; to make provisions to identify and declare online locations used for prohibited purposes in Sri Lanka; to suppress the financing and other support of communication of prohibited statements and for matters connected therewith or incidental thereto
- Citation: Online Safety Act, No. 9 of 2024
- Territorial extent: Sri Lanka
- Enacted by: Parliament of Sri Lanka
- Enacted: January 24, 2024
- Signed by: Speaker of the Parliament
- Signed: February 1, 2024
- Effective: February 1, 2024
- Administered by: Online Safety Commission of Sri Lanka

Legislative history
- Bill title: Personal Data Protection Bill
- Bill citation: Online Safety Bill
- Introduced by: Minister of Public Security
- Introduced: September 18, 2023
- First reading: October 3, 2023
- Second reading: January 23, 2024
- Third reading: January 24, 2024

Supreme Court cases
- Supreme Court Determination on the Bill

Keywords
- Online safety, Cybercrime, Internet regulation
- Status: In force

The Online Safety Act, No. 9 of 2024 is a Sri Lankan Internet safety act aimed at regulating its citizens' Internet usage. It was announced in September 2023 and passed by Parliament on 24 January 2024 by a 108–62 vote.

The bill has been criticised by human rights groups, journalists and opposition politicians as a means of stifling freedom of speech.

== Provisions ==
The bill aims to "make provisions to prohibit online communication of certain statements of fact in Sri Lanka" and "prevent the use of online accounts and inauthentic online accounts for prohibited purposes." It proposes making the posting of any content that a five-member Online Safety Commission deems "illegal", punishable by jail time. It also makes social media platforms such as Facebook, Google and Twitter liable for such content.

President Ranil Wickremesinghe said the bill was intended to combat cybercrime, including data theft, child abuse and online fraud. According to Public Security Minister Tiran Alles, 8,000 instances of cybercrime were logged in Sri Lanka in 2023.

== Reception ==
The bill has resulted in concerns that the government is attempting to suppress freedom of speech. Following the passage of the bill, a group of activists and opposition members protested outside the Parliament Building.

=== Domestic ===
Opposition politician Rauff Hakeem said the bill was "a manifestation of a government which is trying to dismantle even the remaining few safeguards for freedom of expression in this country and to destroy democracy." Samagi Jana Balawegaya politician Harsha de Silva called the bill "a threat to our democracy", saying that it would have "a severe negative impact on expanding e-commerce in Sri Lanka, to provide jobs to our youth and help our economy, which is in desperate need of growth."

Alles said the bill's intent was "not to suppress the media or the opposition", adding, "Any complaint will be taken up by the commission, who will be appointed by the president and they will decide how to act."

=== International ===
The Asia Internet Coalition opposed the bill when it was announced in September 2023, with managing director Jeff Paine saying, "the bill provides for a draconian system to stifle dissent and Sri Lankans' rights to expression." Human Rights Watch also criticised the bill, saying the Online Safety Commission would be able to arbitrarily decide "what online speech is 'false' or 'harmful', remove content, restrict and prohibit internet access, and prosecute individuals and organizations".

Julie Chung, the United States Ambassador to Sri Lanka, expressed concern about the potential impact of the bill. Russian ambassador Levan Dzhagaryan said the bill was purely an internal matter for Sri Lanka.

== See also ==
- Personal Data Protection Act (Sri Lanka)
