= AICS =

AICS may refer to:

- Academy of Integrated Christian Studies, Aizawl, Mizoram, India
- Accuracy International Chassis System, a component of the Accuracy International Arctic Warfare rifle
- Amsterdam International Community School, a school in south Amsterdam, the Netherlands
- Asian Institute of Computer Studies, a private higher educational institution in the Philippines
- Asmara International Community School, an international school in Asmara, Eritrea
- The interdisciplinary study of artificial intelligence and computer science

== See also ==
- AIC (disambiguation)
