= List of liberal arts colleges in the United States =

This is a list of liberal arts colleges in the United States. Liberal arts colleges in the United States are usually four-year colleges that lead students to a bachelor's degree.

These schools are American institutions of higher education, which have traditionally emphasized interactive instruction (although research is still a component of these institutions). They are known for being residential and for having smaller enrollment, class size, and student-teacher-ratios than universities. These colleges also encourage a high level of teacher-student interaction at the center of which are classes taught by full-time faculty, rather than graduate student teaching assistants who often teach classes at large research-oriented universities. The colleges may be coeducational or single-sex, private or public, and either secular or affiliated with a religious body. Some are historically black colleges. Some offer experimental curricula.

== Alabama ==
- Huntingdon College
- Miles College
- Spring Hill College
- Stillman College
- Talladega College
- University of Montevallo

== Arizona ==
- Harrison Middleton University
- Prescott College

== Arkansas ==
- Central Baptist College
- Harding University
- Henderson State University
- Hendrix College
- John Brown University
- Lyon College
- Ouachita Baptist University
- University of the Ozarks

== California ==
- California Lutheran University

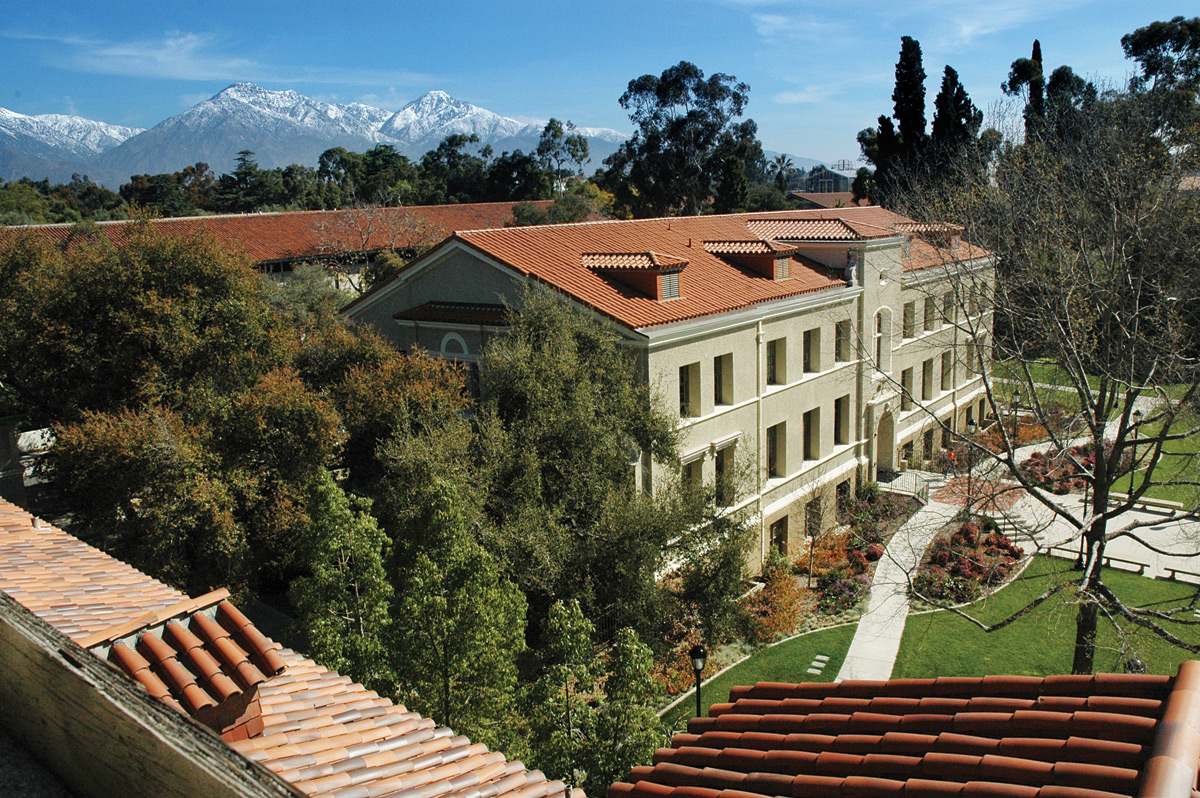
Pomona College

- Claremont Colleges
  - Claremont McKenna College
  - Harvey Mudd College
  - Pitzer College
  - Pomona College
  - Scripps College
- California College of the Arts
- Concordia University, Irvine
- Deep Springs College (2-year-only program, leading to associate degree)
- La Sierra University
- The Master's University

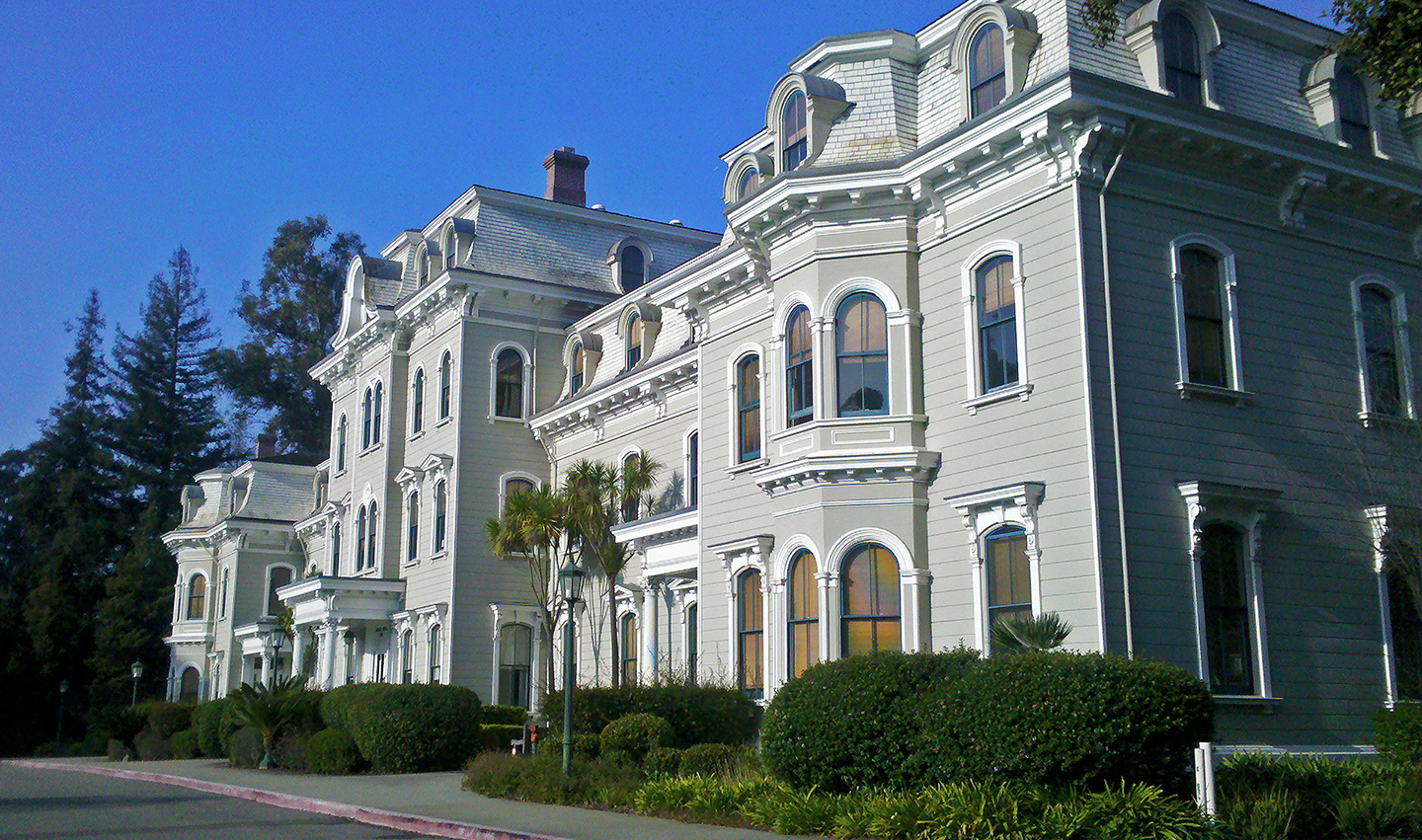
Mills College

- Mills College at Northeastern University
- Mount St. Mary's College
- Occidental College
- Pacific Union College
- Point Loma Nazarene University
- Providence Christian College
- Saint Mary's College of California
- San Diego Christian College
- Soka University of America
- Sonoma State University
- Thomas Aquinas College
- University of Redlands
- Westmont College
- Whittier College
- Zaytuna College

== Colorado ==
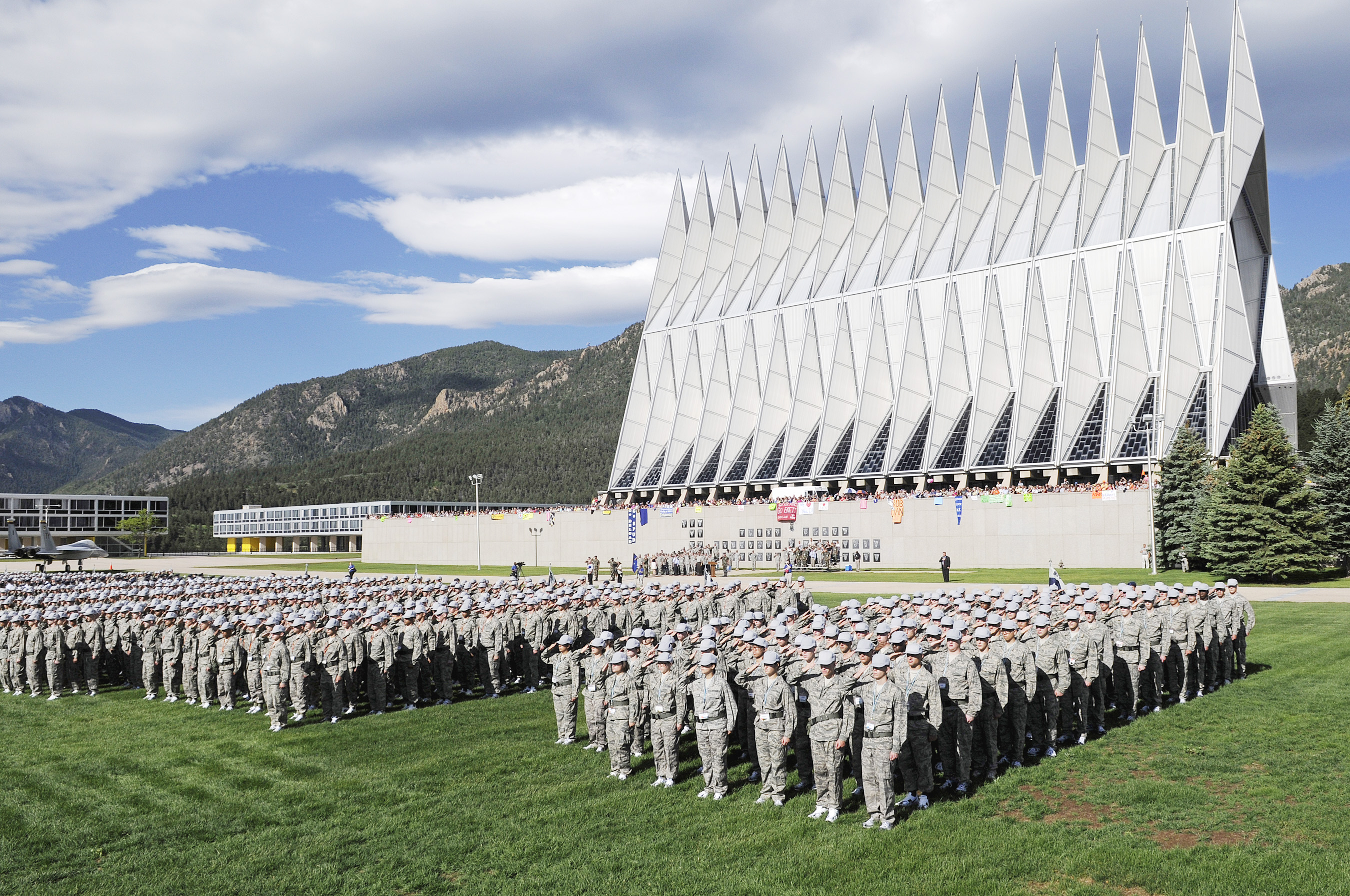
U.S. Air Force Academy

- Adams State University
- Colorado College
- Fort Lewis College
- Naropa University
- United States Air Force Academy
- Western Colorado University

== Connecticut ==
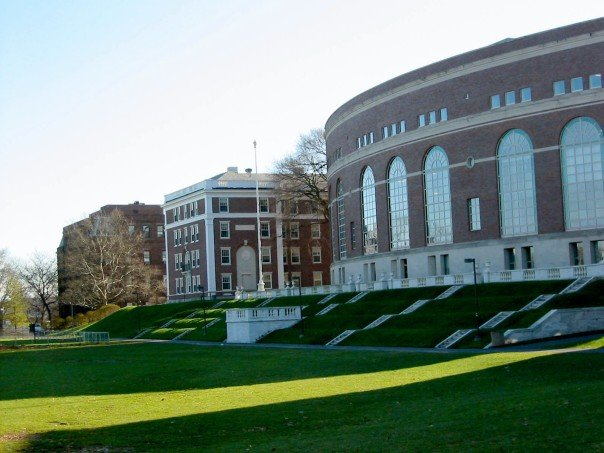
Wesleyan University

- Albertus Magnus College
- Connecticut College
- Eastern Connecticut State University
- Mitchell College
- Trinity College
- University of Saint Joseph
- Wesleyan University

== Florida ==
- Ave Maria University
- Bethune–Cookman University
- Eckerd College
- Flagler College
- New College of Florida
- Palm Beach Atlantic University
- Rollins College
- Saint Leo University
- Southeastern University
- Stetson University
- Warner University

== Georgia ==
- Agnes Scott College
- Berry College
- Covenant College
- Emmanuel University
- Georgia College and State University
- Georgia Gwinnett College
- Mercer University

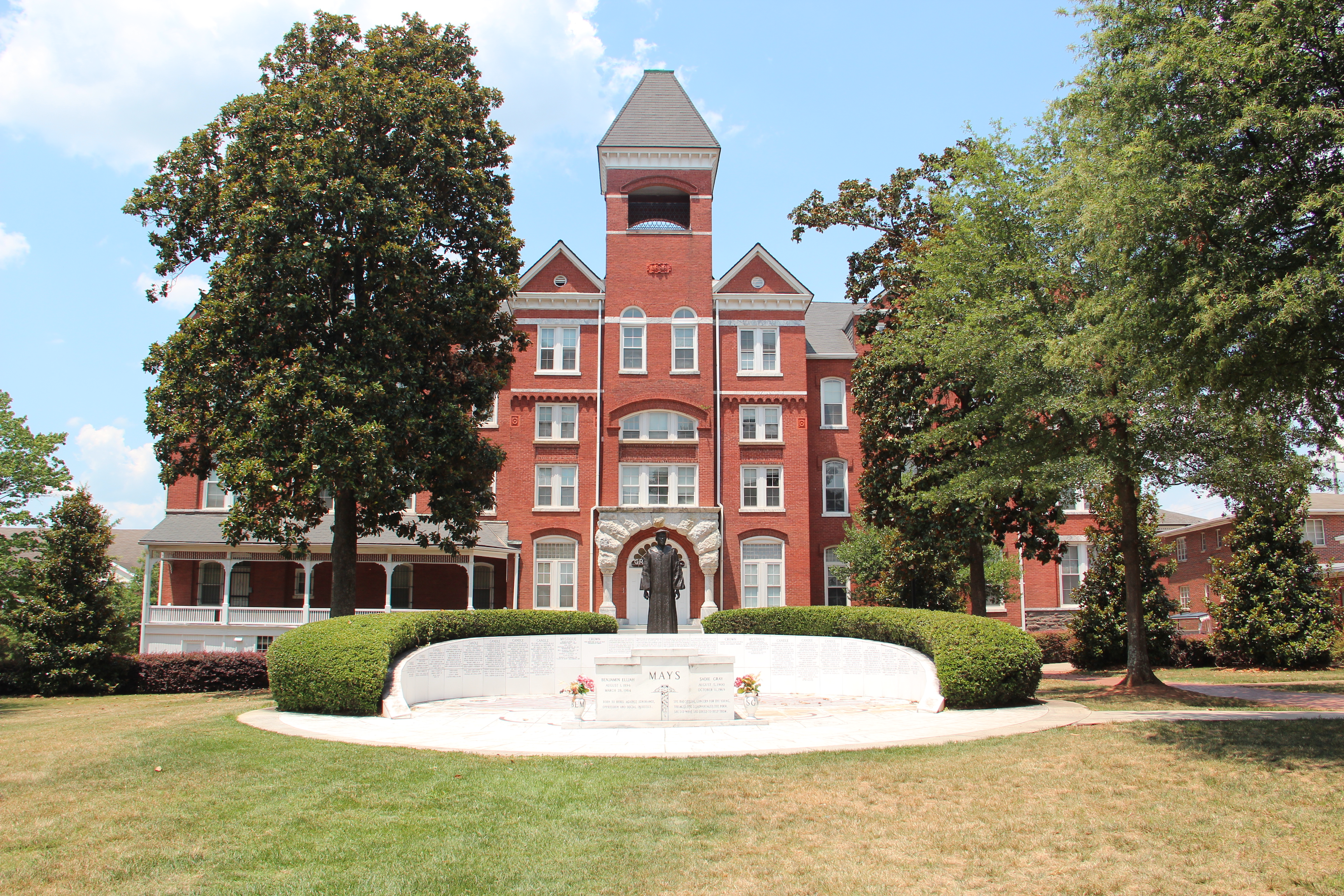
Morehouse College

- Morehouse College
- Morris Brown College
- Oglethorpe University
- Piedmont University
- Point University
- Ralston College
- Reinhardt University
- Spelman College
- Toccoa Falls College
- Wesleyan College
- Young Harris College

== Idaho ==
- College of Idaho
- Lewis-Clark State College
- New Saint Andrews College
- Northwest Nazarene University

== Illinois ==
- Augustana College
- Aurora University
- Blackburn College
- College of the University of Chicago
- Columbia College Chicago
- Elmhurst University
- Eureka College
- Greenville University
- Illinois College
- Illinois Wesleyan University
- Judson University
- Knox College
- Lake Forest College
- McKendree University
- Millikin University
- Monmouth College
- North Central College
- North Park University
- Olivet Nazarene University
- Principia College
- Quincy University
- Rockford University
- Shimer College
- Trinity Christian College
- Trinity International University
- Wheaton College

== Indiana ==
- Anderson University
- Bethel University
- DePauw University
- Earlham College
- Franklin College
- Goshen College
- Grace College
- Hanover College
- Huntington University
- Indiana Wesleyan University
- Manchester University
- Marian University
- Saint Mary-of-the-Woods College
- Saint Mary's College
- Taylor University
- University of Evansville
- University of Saint Francis
- Wabash College

== Iowa ==
- Briar Cliff University
- Central College
- Clarke University
- Coe College
- Cornell College
- Dordt University
- Graceland University
- Grand View University

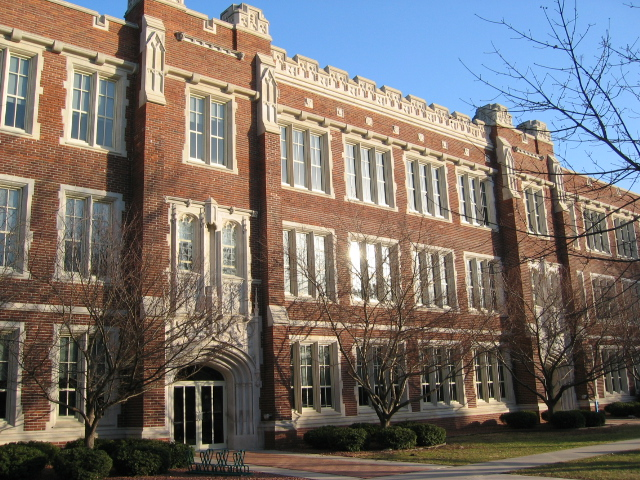
Grinnell College

- Grinnell College
- Loras College
- Luther College
- Morningside University
- Mount Mercy University
- Northwestern College
- Simpson College
- Waldorf University
- Wartburg College

== Kansas ==
- Baker University
- Benedictine College
- Bethany College
- Bethel College
- Central Christian College of Kansas
- Fort Hays State University
- Kansas Wesleyan University
- McPherson College
- MidAmerica Nazarene University
- Newman University
- Ottawa University
- Sterling College
- Washburn University

== Kentucky ==
- Alice Lloyd College
- Asbury University
- Bellarmine University
- Berea College
- Campbellsville University
- Centre College
- Georgetown College
- Kentucky Wesleyan College
- Lindsey Wilson University
- Midway University
- Thomas More University
- Transylvania University
- Union Commonwealth University
- University of the Cumberlands
- University of Pikeville

== Louisiana ==
- Centenary College of Louisiana
- Dillard University
- Louisiana Christian University
- Xavier University of Louisiana
- University of Holy Cross

== Maine ==
- Bates College
- Bowdoin College
- Colby College
- College of the Atlantic
- Saint Joseph's College of Maine
- Unity Environmental University
- University of Maine at Farmington
- University of Maine at Fort Kent

== Maryland ==
- Goucher College
- Hood College
- McDaniel College
- Mount Saint Mary's University
- Notre Dame of Maryland University
- St. John's College
- St. Mary's College of Maryland
- Stevenson University
- United States Naval Academy
- Washington College

== Massachusetts ==
- Amherst College
- Assumption University
- Clark University
- College of the Holy Cross
- Curry College
- Dean College
- Elms College
- Emerson College
- Emmanuel College
- Gordon College
- Hampshire College
- Lesley University
- Massachusetts College of Liberal Arts
- Merrimack College
- Mount Holyoke College
- Regis College
- Simmons University
- Smith College
- Stonehill College
- Wellesley College
- Wheaton College
- Williams College

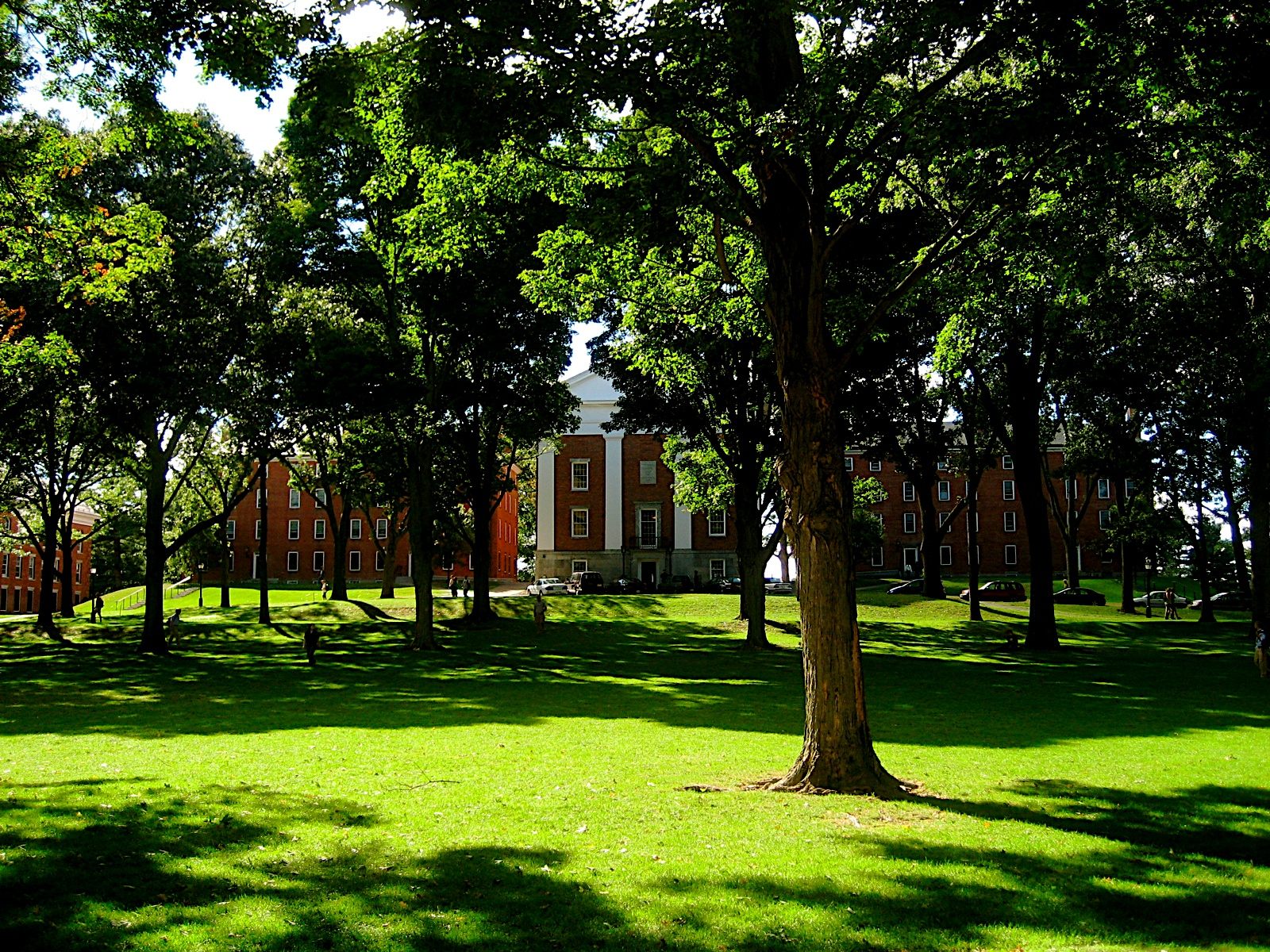
Amherst College

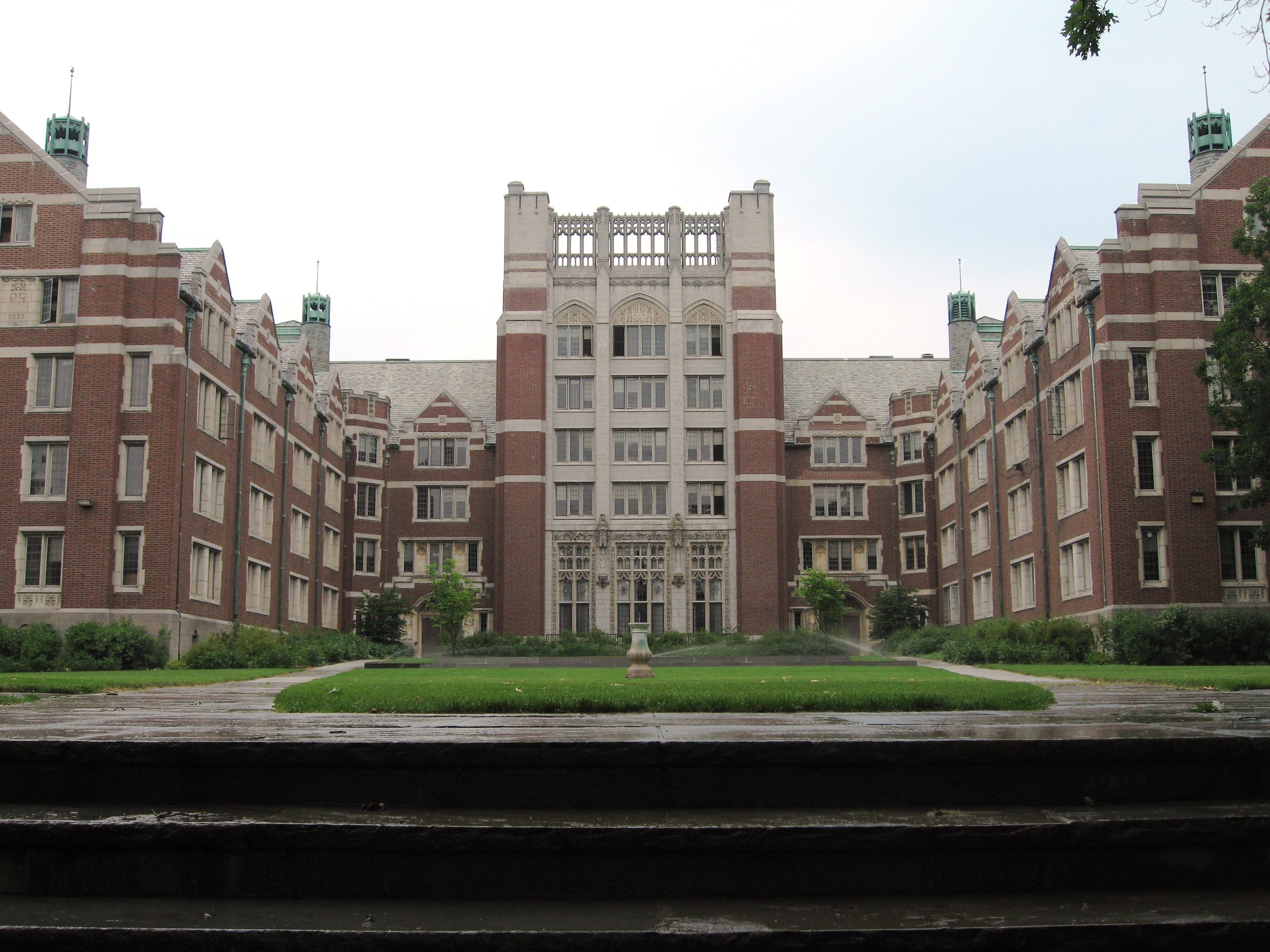
Wellesley College

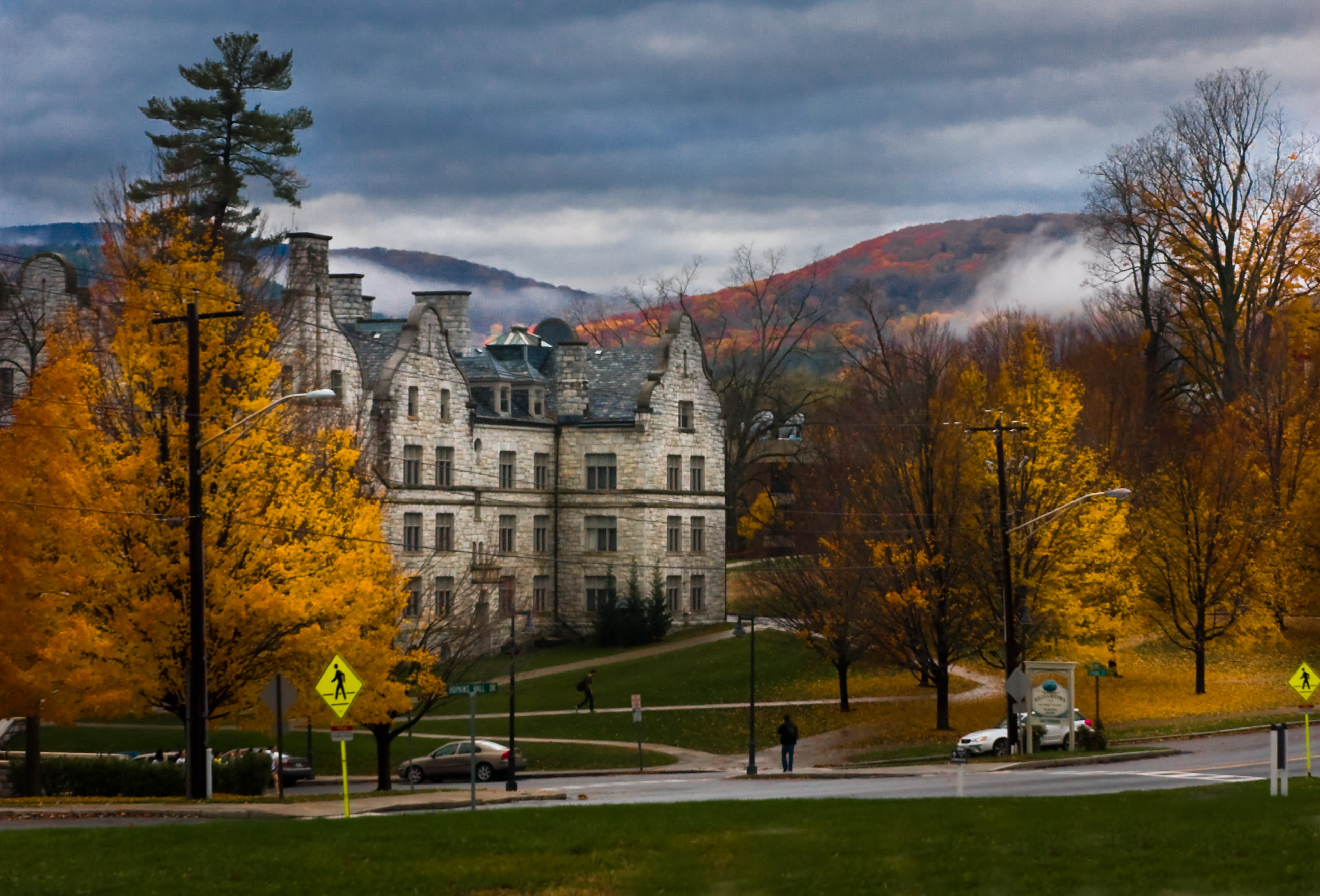
Williams College

== Michigan ==
- Adrian College
- Albion College
- Alma College
- Aquinas College
- Calvin University
- Concordia University
- Hillsdale College
- Hope College
- Kalamazoo College
- Madonna University
- University of Olivet
- Rochester Christian University

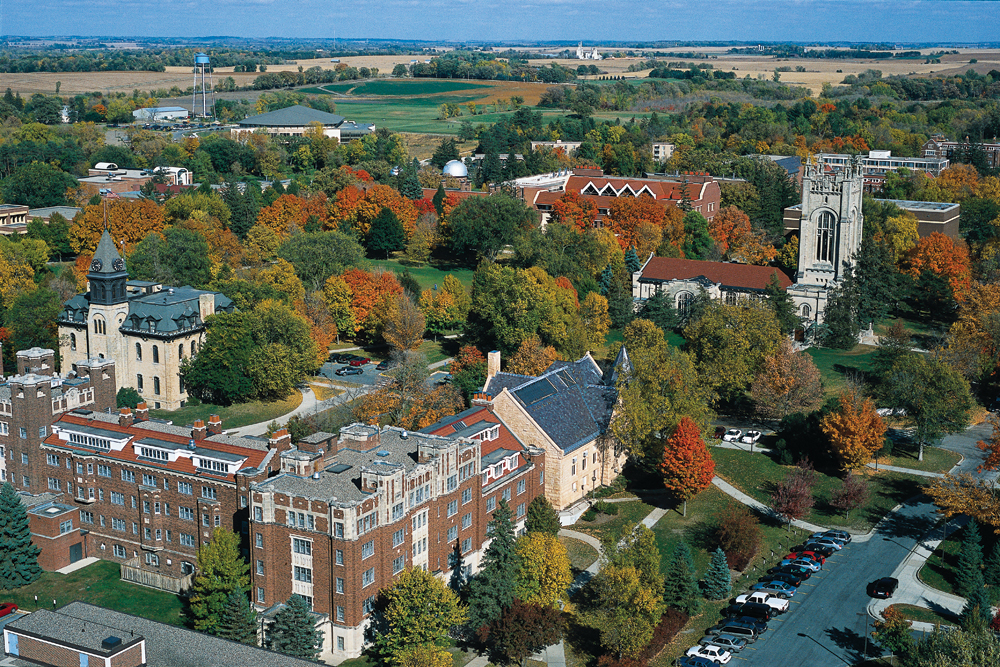
Carleton College

== Minnesota ==
- Augsburg University
- Bethany Lutheran College
- Carleton College
- College of Saint Benedict and Saint John's University
- Concordia College
- Gustavus Adolphus College
- Hamline University
- Macalester College
- The College of Saint Scholastica
- St. Olaf College
- University of Minnesota Morris
- University of St. Thomas

== Mississippi ==
- Blue Mountain Christian University
- Millsaps College
- Rust College
- Tougaloo College
- Mississippi University for Women
- William Carey University

== Missouri ==
- Central Methodist University
- College of the Ozarks
- Columbia College of Missouri
- Culver–Stockton College
- Drury University
- Evangel University
- Hannibal-LaGrange University
- Lindenwood University
- Missouri Baptist University
- Missouri Valley University
- Southwest Baptist University
- Stephens College
- Truman State University
- Westminster College
- William Jewell College

== Montana ==
- Carroll College
- Rocky Mountain College
- University of Providence

== Nebraska ==
- Doane University
- Hastings College
- Midland University
- Nebraska Wesleyan University

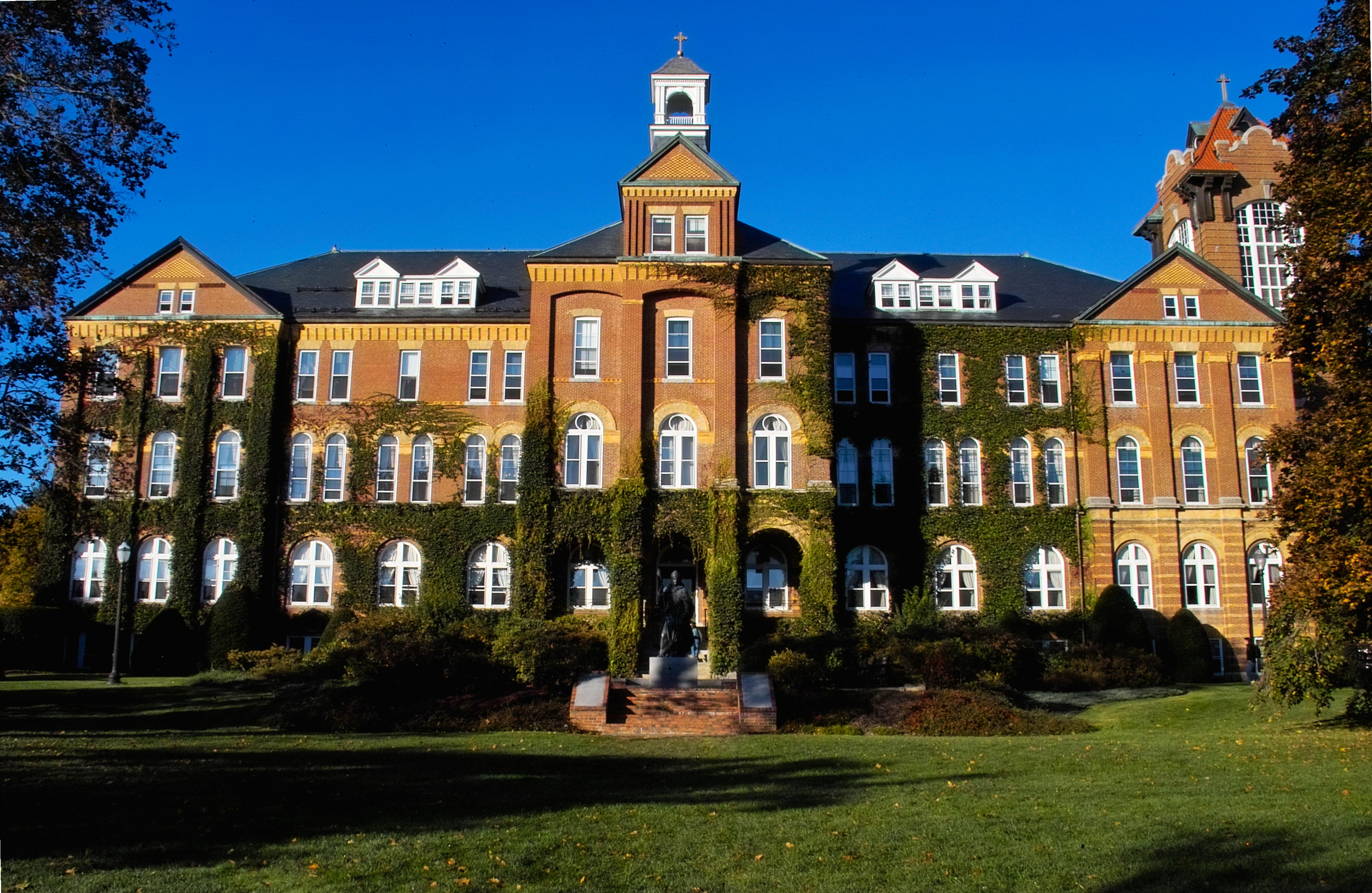
Saint Anselm College

== New Hampshire ==
- Colby–Sawyer College
- Franklin Pierce University
- Keene State College
- New England College
- Rivier University
- Saint Anselm College
- Thomas More College of Liberal Arts

== New Jersey ==
- Caldwell University
- Drew University
- Ramapo College
- Saint Elizabeth University
- Saint Peter's University

== New Mexico ==
- St. John's College

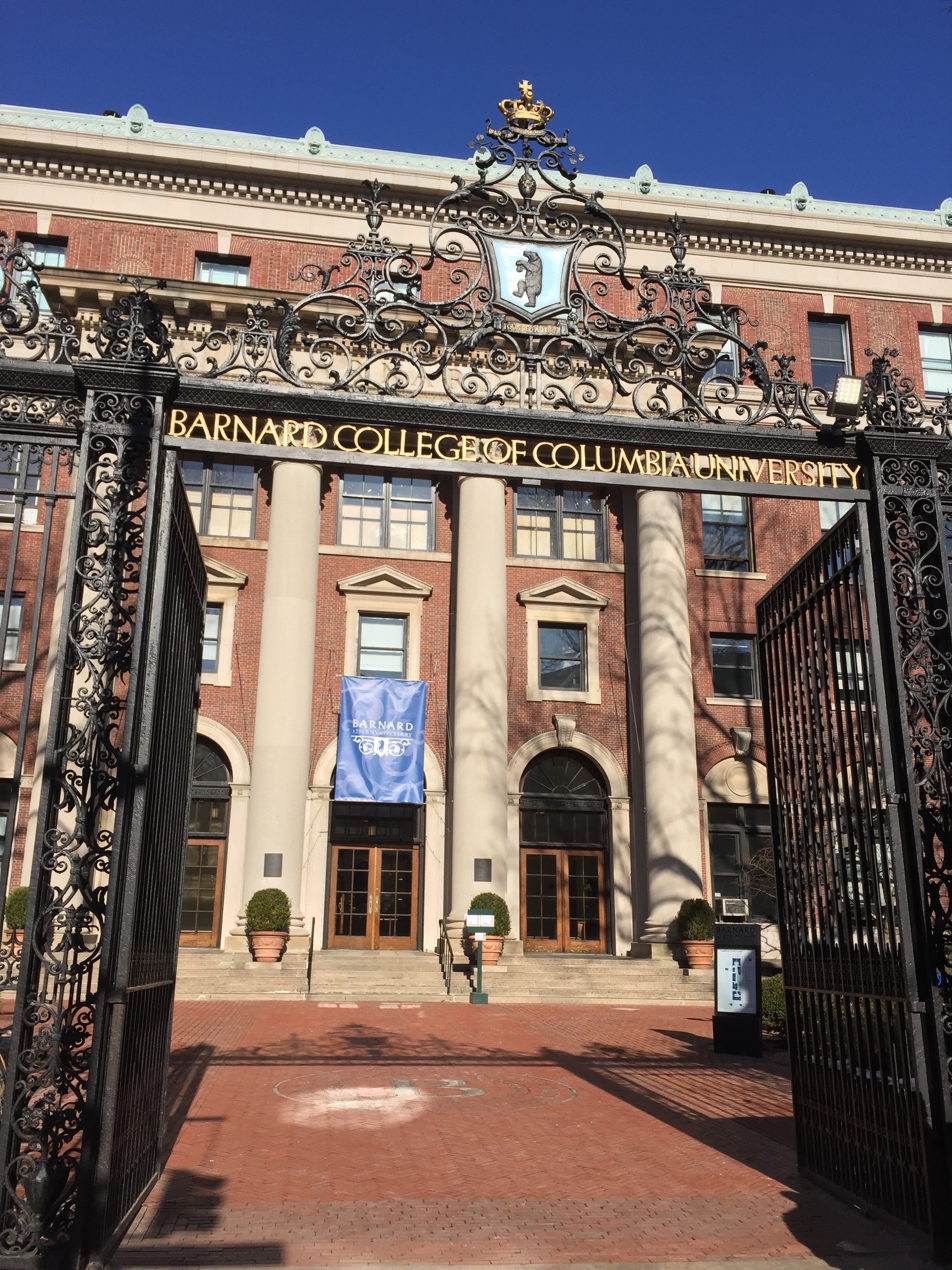
Barnard College

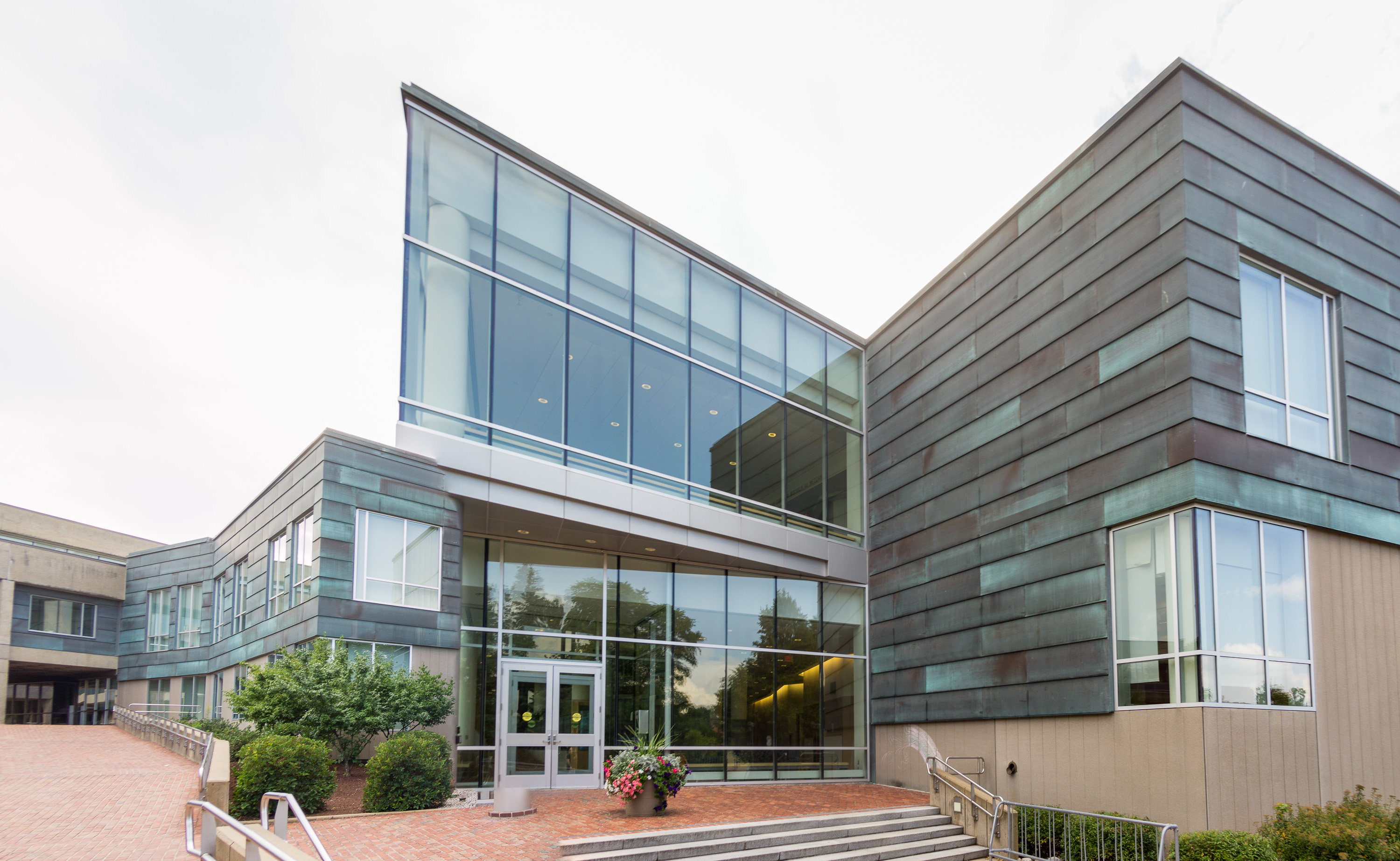
Hamilton College

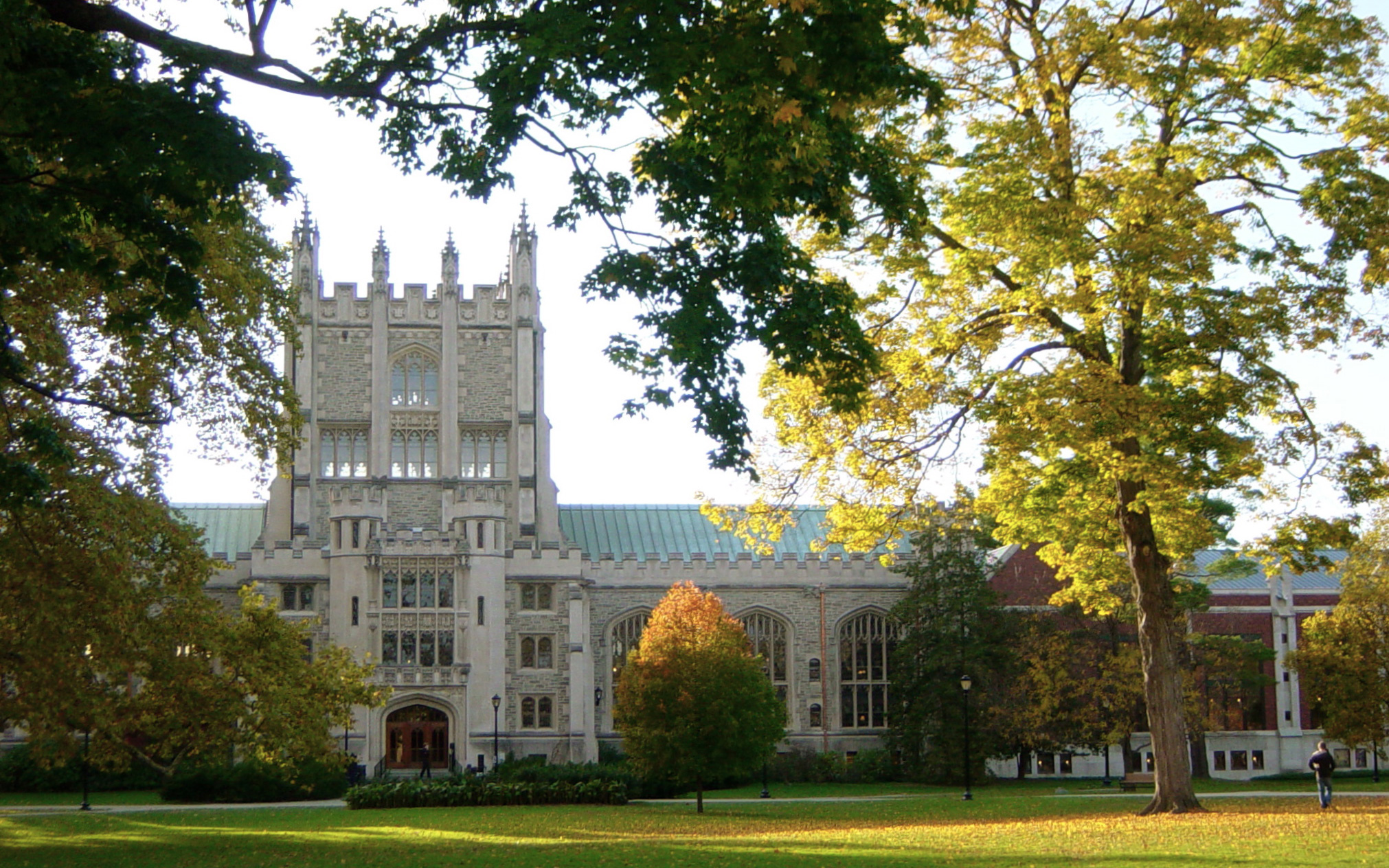
Vassar College

== New York ==
- Bard College
- Barnard College
- Brooklyn College
- Colgate University
- University of Mount Saint Vincent
- Columbia College (oldest undergraduate college of Columbia University)
- D'Youville University
- Elmira College
- Eugene Lang College The New School for Liberal Arts (a division of The New School university)
- Hamilton College
- Hartwick College
- Hobart and William Smith Colleges
- Houghton University
- Ithaca College
- Keuka College
- Le Moyne College
- Manhattan University
- Manhattanville University
- Marymount Manhattan College
- Mercy University
- Mount Saint Mary College
- Roberts Wesleyan University
- St. Bonaventure University
- St. Joseph's University
- St. Lawrence University
- St. Thomas Aquinas College
- Sarah Lawrence College
- Siena University
- Skidmore College
- State University of New York at Geneseo
- State University of New York at Purchase
- Union College
- United States Military Academy
- Vassar College
- Wagner College

== North Carolina ==
- Barton College
- Belmont Abbey College
- Bennett College
- Brevard College
- Catawba College

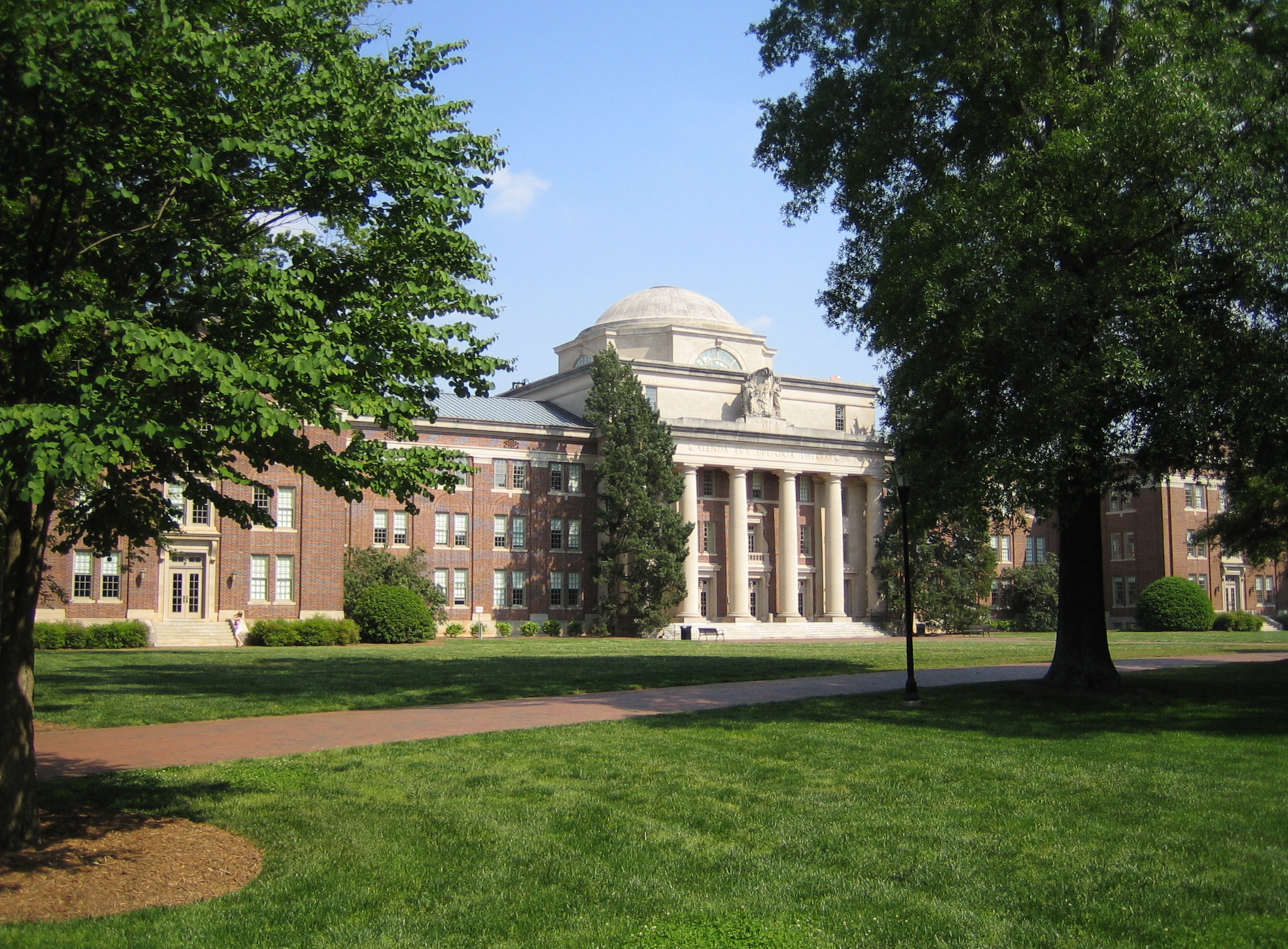
Davidson College

- Davidson College
- Elon University
- Greensboro College
- Guilford College
- High Point University
- Lenoir–Rhyne University
- Mars Hill University
- Meredith College
- Montreat College
- North Carolina Wesleyan University
- Salem College
- University of Mount Olive
- University of North Carolina at Asheville
- Wake Forest University
- Warren Wilson College
- William Peace University

== North Dakota ==
- University of Jamestown

== Ohio ==
- Ashland University
- Antioch College
- Baldwin Wallace University
- Bluffton University
- Capital University
- Cedarville University
- College of Wooster
- Defiance College
- Denison University
- Heidelberg University
- Hiram College
- John Carroll University

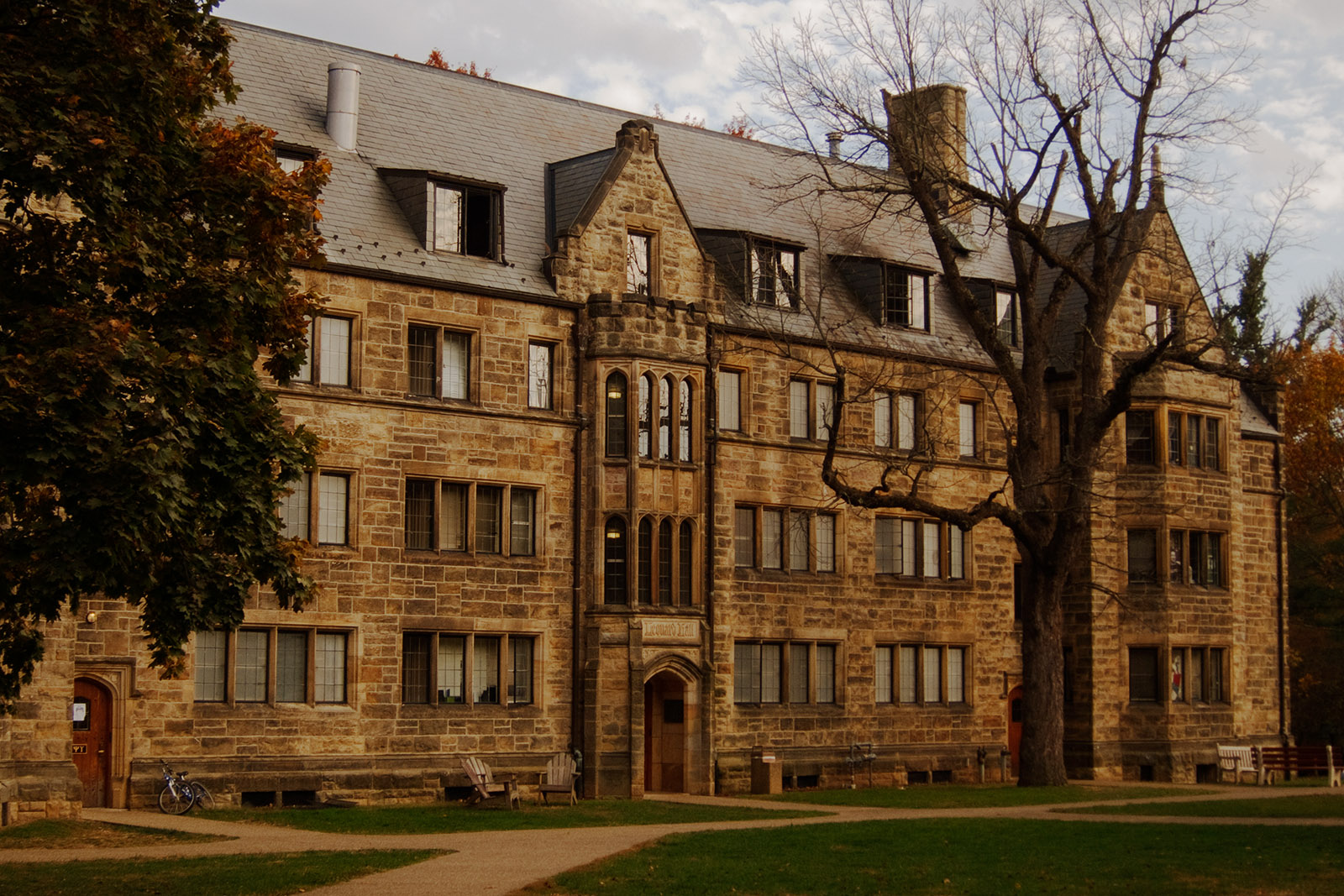
Kenyon College

- Kenyon College
- Lake Erie College
- Malone University
- Marietta College
- Miami University
- Mount St. Joseph University
- Mount Vernon Nazarene University
- Muskingum University

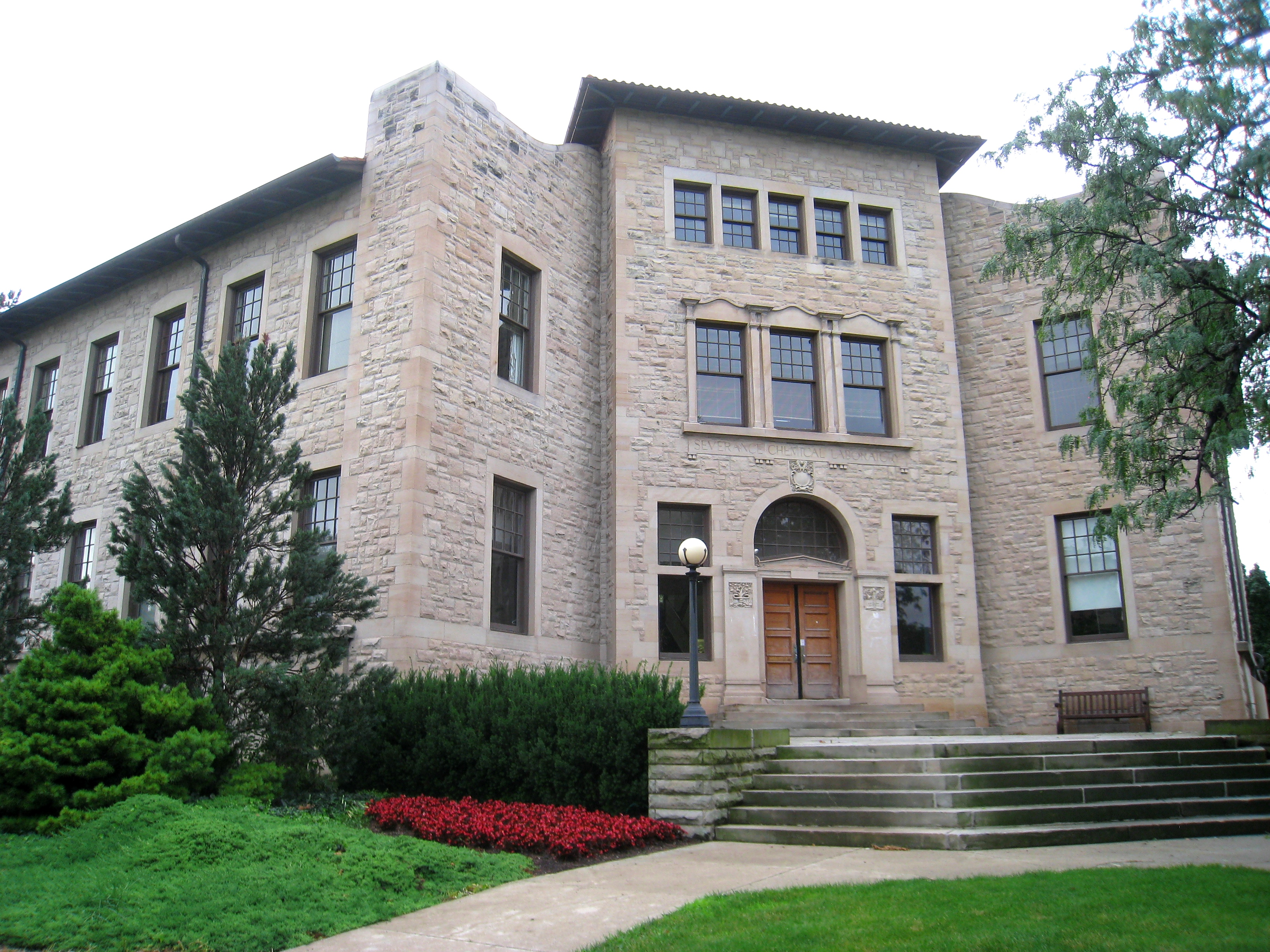
Oberlin College

- Oberlin College
- Ohio Dominican University
- Ohio Northern University
- Ohio Wesleyan University
- Otterbein University
- Tiffin University
- University of Findlay
- University of Mount Union
- Wilmington College
- Wittenberg University

== Oklahoma ==
- Oklahoma Baptist University
- Southern Nazarene University
- University of Science and Arts of Oklahoma
- Oklahoma Wesleyan University

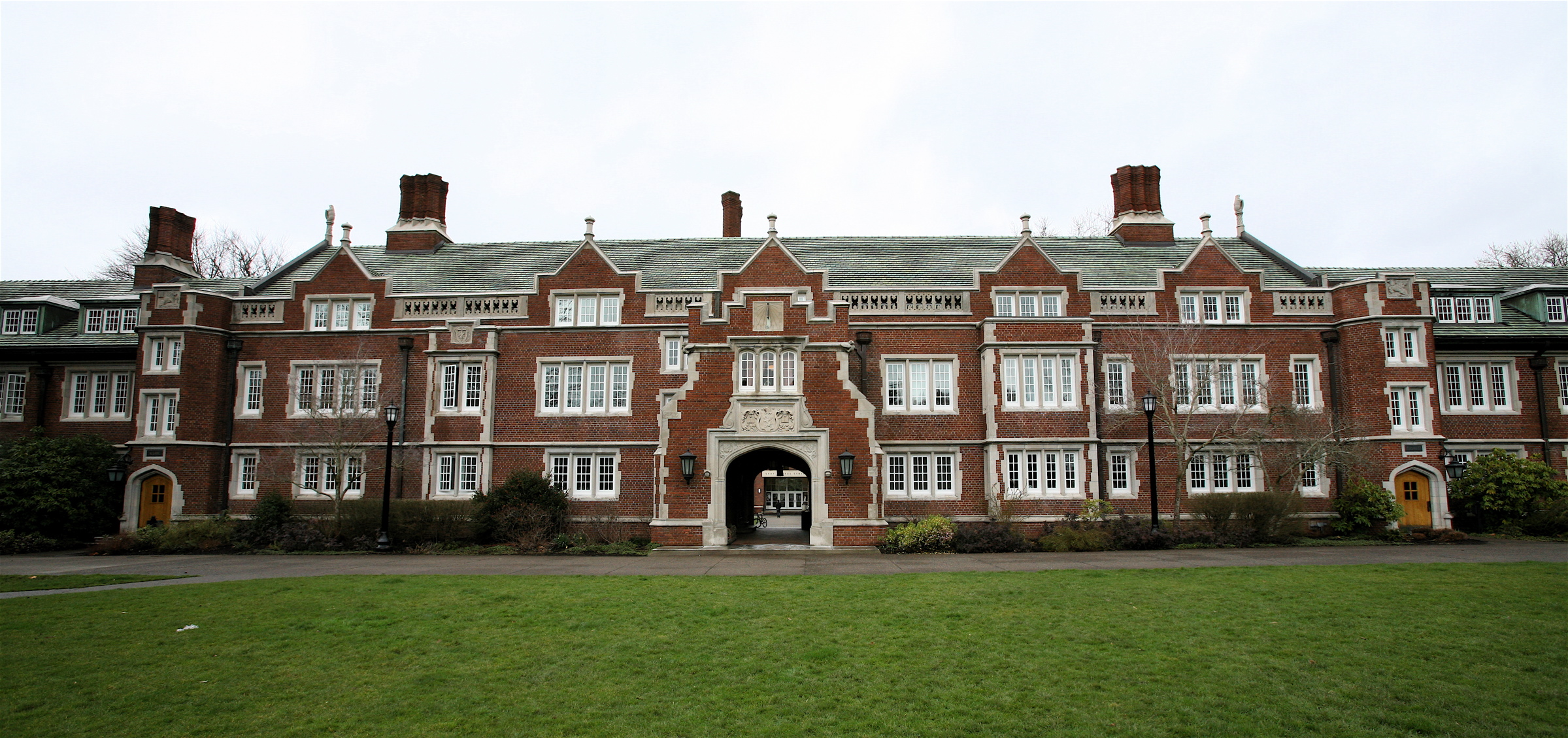
Reed College

== Oregon ==
- George Fox University
- Gutenberg College
- Lewis & Clark College
- Linfield University
- Oregon State University College of Liberal Arts
- Reed College
- Southern Oregon University
- University of Portland
- Warner Pacific University
- Western Oregon University
- Willamette University

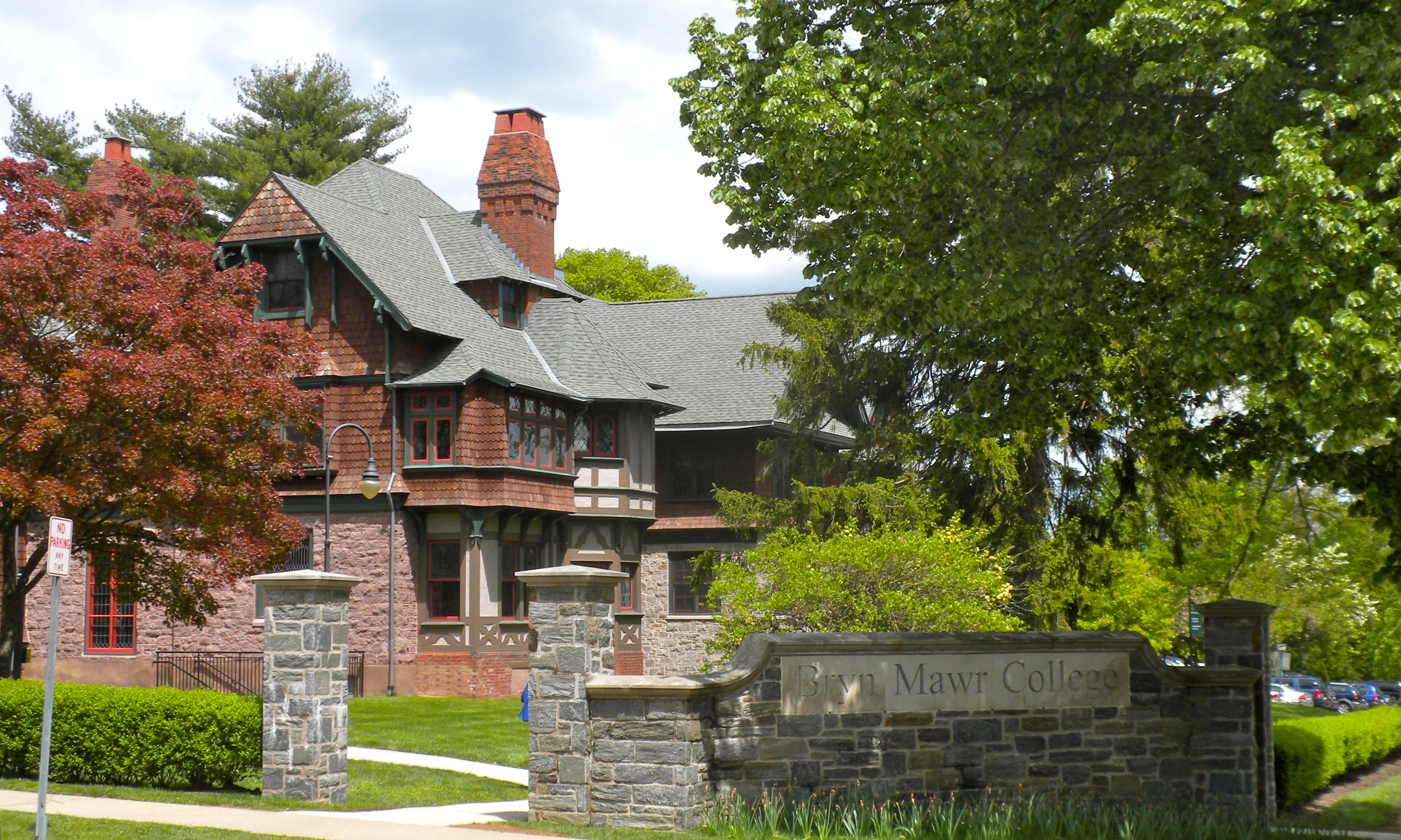
Bryn Mawr College

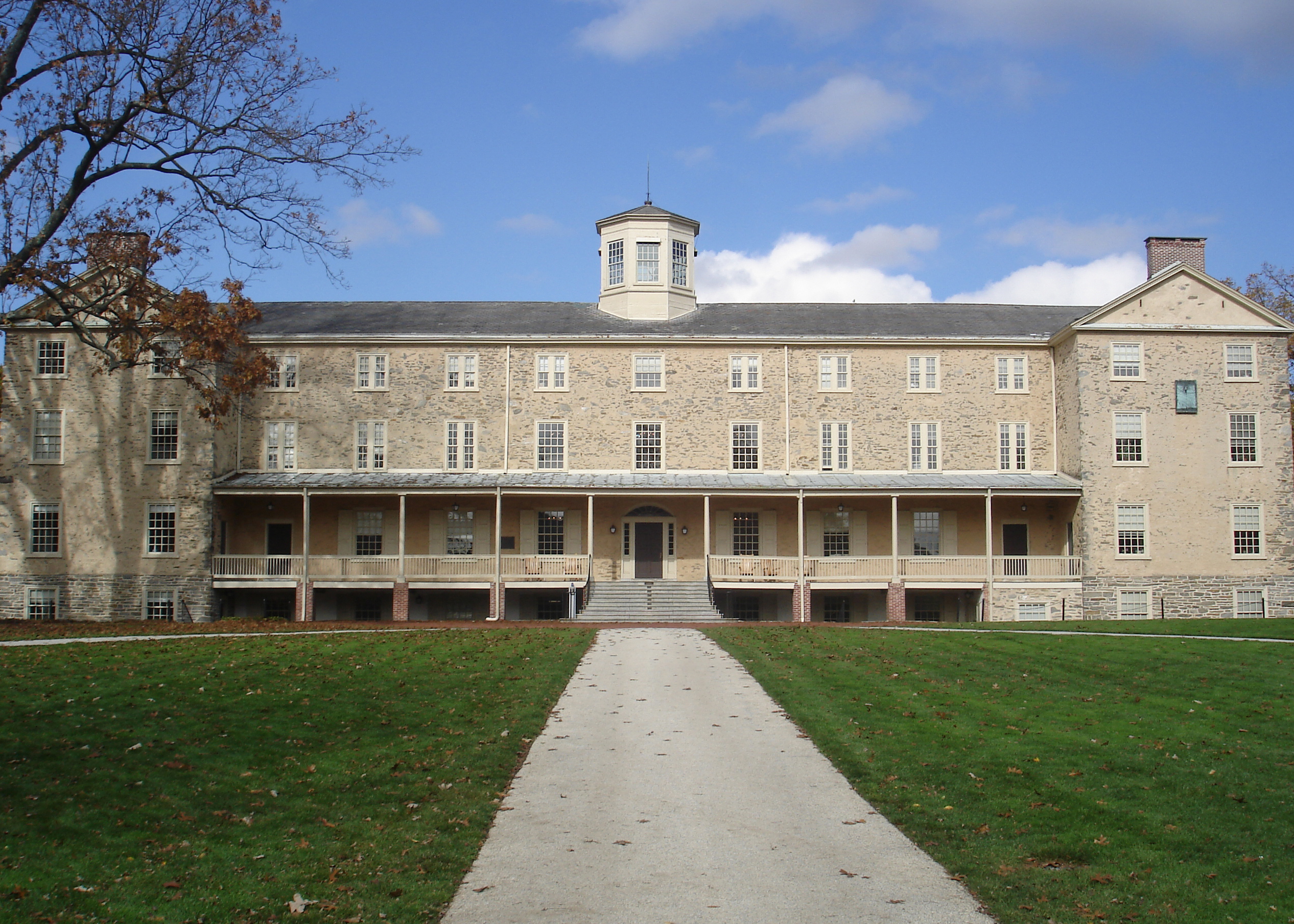
Haverford College

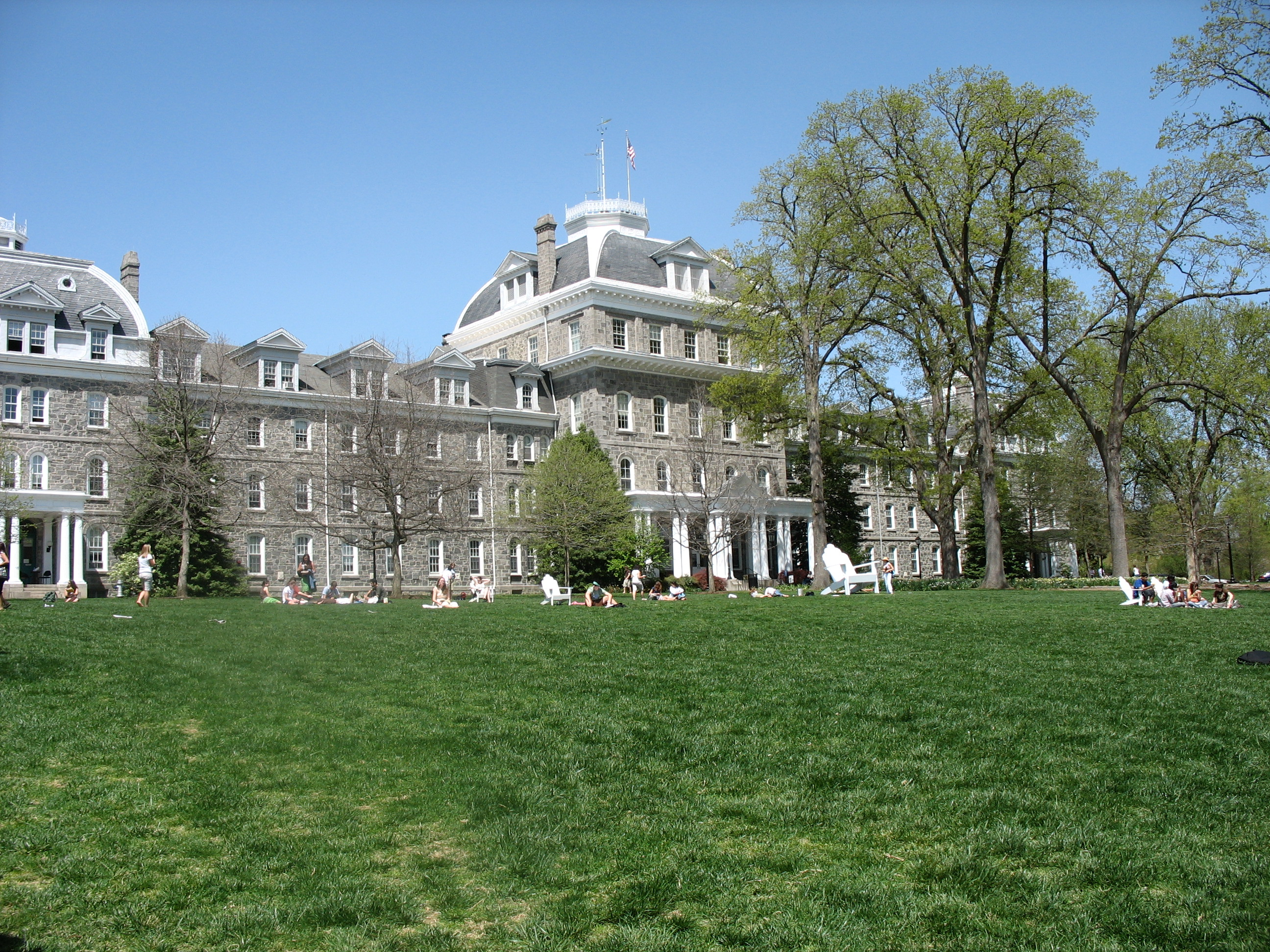
Swarthmore College

== Pennsylvania ==
- Albright College
- Allegheny College
- Bryn Athyn College
- Bryn Mawr College
- Bucknell University
- Carlow University
- Cedar Crest College
- Chatham University
- Chestnut Hill College
- Commonwealth University-Mansfield
- Dickinson College
- Elizabethtown College
- Franklin & Marshall College
- Gannon University
- Geneva College
- Gettysburg College
- Grove City College
- Gwynedd Mercy University
- Haverford College
- Immaculata University
- Juniata College
- Keystone College
- King's College
- La Salle University
- Lafayette College
- Lebanon Valley College
- Lycoming College
- Mercyhurst University
- Messiah University
- Misericordia University
- Moravian University
- Muhlenberg College
- Point Park University
- Rosemont College
- Saint Francis University
- Saint Vincent College
- Susquehanna University
- Swarthmore College
- Thiel College
- Ursinus College
- Washington & Jefferson College
- Waynesburg University
- Westminster College
- Wilson College

== Rhode Island ==
- Providence College
- Roger Williams University

== South Carolina ==
- Allen University
- Benedict College
- Charleston Southern University
- Coker University
- College of Charleston
- Columbia College
- Converse University
- Erskine College
- Furman University
- Lander University
- Morris College
- Newberry College
- North Greenville University
- Presbyterian College
- Southern Wesleyan University
- Wofford College

== South Dakota ==
- Augustana University
- Mount Marty University
- University of Sioux Falls

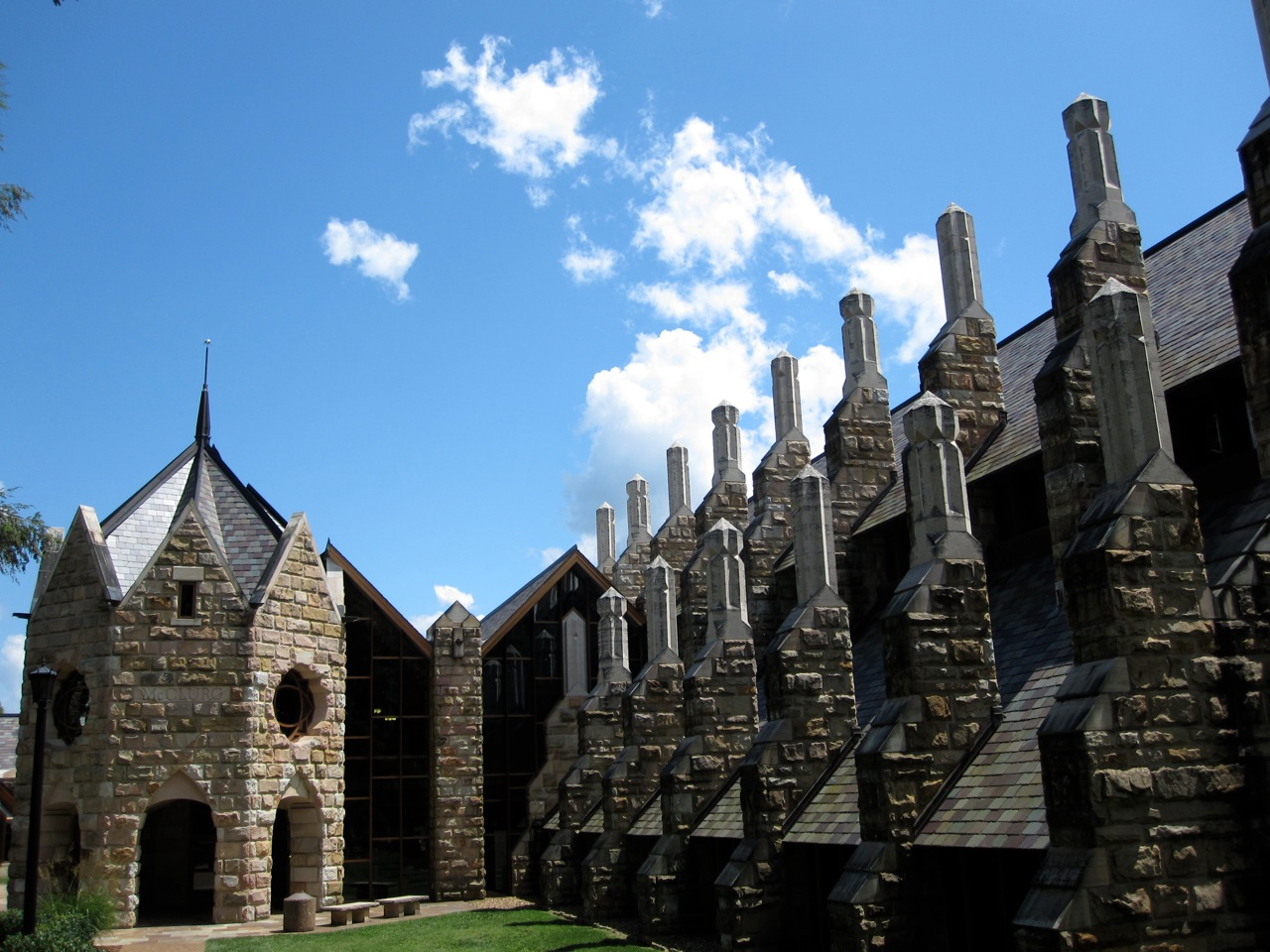
Sewanee: The University of the South

== Tennessee ==
- Belmont University
- Bethel University
- Carson–Newman University
- Cumberland University
- Fisk University
- King University
- Lane College
- Lee University
- Lincoln Memorial University
- Lipscomb University
- Maryville College
- Milligan University
- New College Franklin
- Rhodes College
- Sewanee: The University of the South
- University of Tennessee Southern (formerly Martin Methodist College)
- Tennessee Wesleyan University
- Union University

== Texas ==
- Abilene Christian University
- Austin College
- Dallas Baptist University
- Hardin-Simmons University
- Houston Christian University
- Howard Payne University
- Midwestern State University
- St. Edward's University
- St. Mary's University
- Schreiner University
- Southwestern University
- Texas Wesleyan University
- Trinity University
- University of Dallas
- University of the Incarnate Word
- University of St. Thomas
- Wayland Baptist University

== Utah ==
- Westminster University

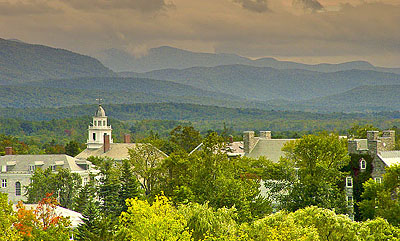
Middlebury College

== Vermont ==
- Bennington College
- Landmark College
- Middlebury College
- Saint Michael's College
- Sterling College
- Vermont State University

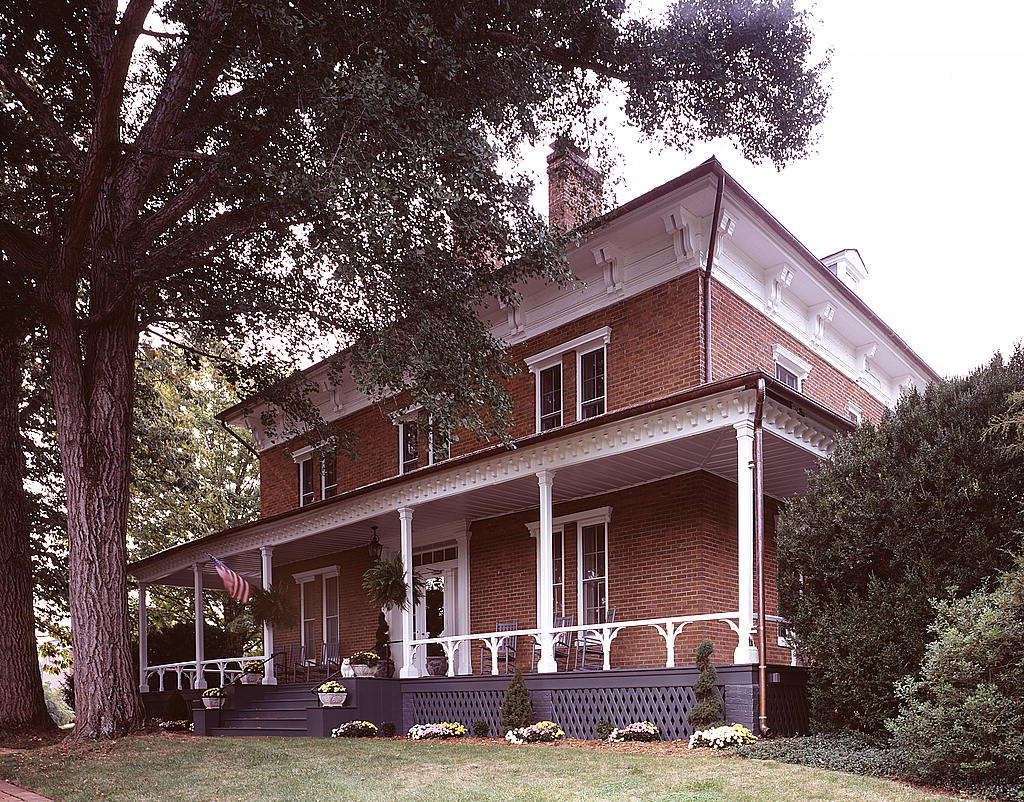
Washington and Lee University

== Virginia ==
- Bluefield University
- Bridgewater College
- Christendom College
- Christopher Newport University
- Emory & Henry University
- Hampden–Sydney College
- Hollins University
- Mary Baldwin University
- Patrick Henry College
- Randolph College
- Randolph–Macon College
- Roanoke College
- Shenandoah University
- Southern Virginia University
- Sweet Briar College
- University of Lynchburg
- University of Mary Washington
- University of Richmond
- University of Virginia's College at Wise
- Virginia Wesleyan University
- Washington and Lee University

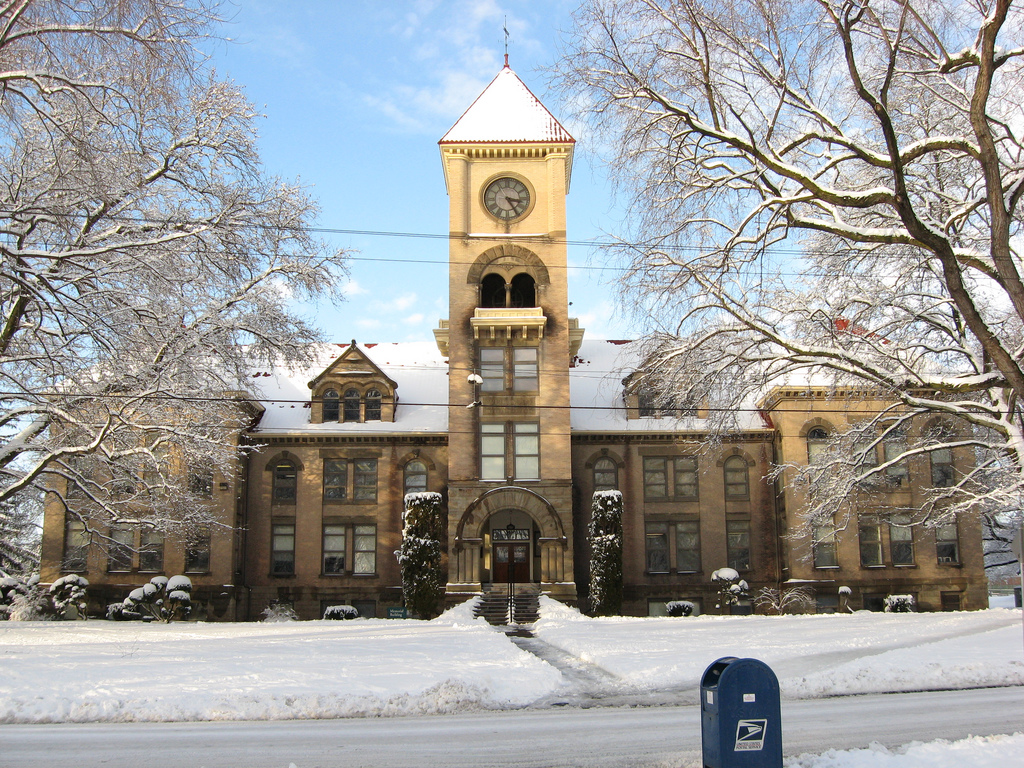
Whitman College

== Washington ==
- Evergreen State College
- Gonzaga University
- Northwest University
- Pacific Lutheran University
- St. Martin's University
- Seattle Pacific University
- Seattle University
- University of Puget Sound
- University of Washington, Bothell
- Whitman College
- Whitworth University

== West Virginia ==
- Bethany College
- Concord University
- Davis & Elkins College
- Shepherd University
- West Virginia Wesleyan College

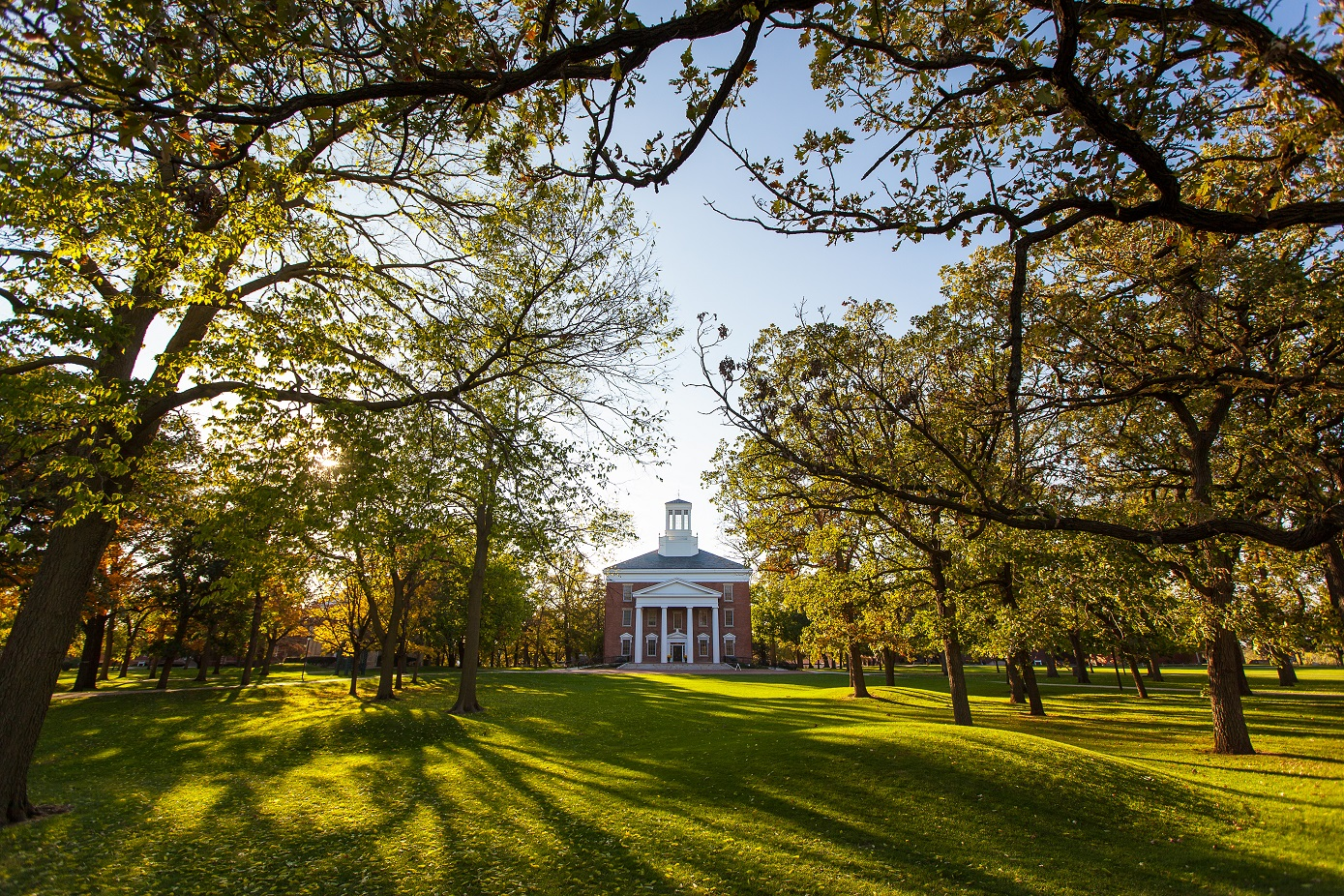
Beloit College

== Wisconsin ==
- Alverno College
- Beloit College
- Carroll University
- Carthage College
- Edgewood University
- Lakeland University
- Lawrence University
- Marian University
- Mount Mary University
- Ripon College
- St. Norbert College
- University of Wisconsin–Superior
- Wisconsin Lutheran College

== Wyoming ==
- Wyoming Catholic College

== Closed ==
- Alderson Broaddus University
- Arizona International College
- Bacone College
- Birmingham–Southern College
- Dana College
- Eastern Nazarene College
- Fontbonne University
- Goddard College
- Green Mountain College
- John Witherspoon College
- Judson College
- The King's College
- MacMurray College
- Magdalen College of the Liberal Arts
- Marlboro College
- Mount Ida College
- Northland College
- Saint Joseph's College (later reopened to offer vocational certification courses)
- Sierra Nevada University
- Urbana University
- Wells College
- Wesley College

== See also ==
- Great Books Program
