= Personal Data Protection Act (Sri Lanka) =

2022 Sri Lankan law

Personal Data Protection Act, No. 9 of 2022

Parliament of Sri Lanka
- Long title: An Act to provide for the regulation of processing of personal data; to identify and strengthen the rights of data subjects in relation to the protection of personal data; to provide for the establishment of the Data Protection Authority; and to provide for matters connected therewith or incidental thereto
- Citation: Personal Data Protection Act, No. 9 of 2022; Personal Data Protection (Amendment) Act, No. 22 of 2025
- Territorial extent: Worldwide
- Enacted by: Parliament of Sri Lanka
- Enacted: March 9, 2022; October 21, 2025 (Amendment)
- Signed by: Speaker of the Parliament
- Signed: March 19, 2022; October 30, 2025 (Amendment)
- Effective: 17 July 2023 (Part V); 1 December 2023 (Parts VI, VIII, IX and X); 1 January 2027 (Parts I and III, scheduled); Remaining parts pending commencement (Note: Note: The commencement date of 18 March 2025, originally appointed for Parts I, II, III and VII, was revoked by Gazette Extraordinary No. 2427/34. Gazette Extraordinary No. 2498/16 subsequently appointed 1 January 2027 as the commencement date for Parts I and III. Parts II, IV and VII remain pending commencement.)
- Administered by: Data Protection Authority of Sri Lanka

Legislative history
- Bill title: Personal Data Protection Bill
- Bill citation: Personal Data Protection Bill; Personal Data Protection (Amendment) Bill
- Introduced by: Minister of Technology; Minister of Digital Economy (Amendment)
- Introduced: November 25, 2021; March 27, 2025 (Amendment)
- First reading: January 20, 2022; May 8, 2025 (Amendment)
- Second reading: March 9, 2022; June 3, 2025 (Amendment)
- Third reading: March 9, 2022; October 21, 2025 (Amendment)

Keywords
- Data protection, Privacy, Personal data
- Status: Not fully in force

The Personal Data Protection Act, No. 9 of 2022 (abbreviated PDPA) is a comprehensive data protection law enacted to regulate the processing of personal data in Sri Lanka. The Act aims to protect the privacy of individuals, establish rights for data subjects, and impose obligations on data controllers and processors.

== Background ==
The Act was passed by the Parliament of Sri Lanka in 2022 to address the growing need for data protection in the digital age. It is designed to safeguard personal data while allowing for legitimate data processing activities.

== Key features ==
=== Scope and application ===
The Act applies to the processing of personal data:

- Wholly or partly within Sri Lanka
- By controllers or processors domiciled or established in Sri Lanka
- Related to the offering of goods or services to data subjects in Sri Lanka
- Involving the monitoring of data subjects' behavior in Sri Lanka

=== Data Protection Authority ===
The Act establishes the Data Protection Authority of Sri Lanka as the primary regulatory body responsible for enforcing the law and promoting data protection practices.

=== Rights of data subjects ===
The Act grants several rights to data subjects, including:

- Right of access to personal data
- Right to rectification of inaccurate data
- Right to erasure ("right to be forgotten")
- Right to object to processing
- Right to withdraw consent
- Right to review automated decision-making

=== Obligations of data controllers and processors ===
Key obligations include:

- Ensuring lawful processing of personal data
- Implementing data protection management programs
- Conducting data protection impact assessments in certain cases
- Appointing Data Protection Officers under specific circumstances
- Notifying the Authority and affected individuals of personal data breaches

=== Cross-border data transfers ===
The Act regulates the transfer of personal data outside Sri Lanka, requiring adequate protection measures or specific conditions to be met.

=== Special categories of personal data ===
The Act provides additional protections for sensitive personal data, including data revealing racial or ethnic origin, political opinions, religious beliefs, health data, and biometric data.

=== Penalties ===
The Act empowers the Authority to impose penalties for non-compliance:

- For the first instance of non-compliance, a penalty not exceeding ten million rupees may be imposed.
- For subsequent non-compliances, an additional penalty of twice the amount imposed for the previous non-compliance may be levied.

The Authority considers several factors when determining penalties, including the nature and duration of the violation, the number of data subjects affected, and any actions taken to mitigate damages.

== Implementation timeline ==
The Act is being implemented in phases. The initial implementation schedule was established and subsequently amended by official gazette notifications:

=== Phase 1: July 17, 2023 ===
Part V of the Act, concerning the establishment of the Data Protection Authority, came into operation on 17 July 2023, pursuant to Gazette Extraordinary No. 2341/59, published on 21 July 2023.

=== Phase 2: December 1, 2023 ===
The following parts of the Act came into operation on 1 December 2023, pursuant to Gazette Extraordinary No. 2366/08, published on 8 January 2024:

- Part VI – Director-General and staff of the Data Protection Authority
- Part VIII – Fund of the Authority
- Part IX – Miscellaneous provisions
- Part X – Interpretation

=== Phase 3: Revocation of the March 18, 2025 commencement date ===
Gazette Extraordinary No. 2366/08 had originally appointed 18 March 2025 as the commencement date for the following parts of the Act:

- Part I – Processing of Personal Data
- Part II – Rights of Data Subjects
- Part III – Controllers and Processors
- Part VII – Penalties

However, Gazette Extraordinary No. 2427/34, published on 14 March 2025, repealed the provision appointing this commencement date.

=== Phase 4: January 1, 2027 (Scheduled) ===
Gazette Extraordinary No. 2498/16, published on 22 July 2026, appointed 1 January 2027 as the commencement date for the following parts of the Act:

- Part I – Processing of Personal Data
- Part III – Controllers and Processors

The order was issued by President Anura Kumara Dissanayake in his capacity as President and Minister of Digital Economy on 13 July 2026.

=== Remaining provisions pending commencement ===
As of November 2026, commencement dates have not been appointed for the following parts of the Act:

- Part II – Rights of Data Subjects
- Part IV – Use of Personal Data to Disseminate Solicited Messages
- Part VII – Penalties

The commencement of these provisions remains subject to further orders published in the Gazette.

== Impact and significance ==
The Personal Data Protection Act represents a significant step in Sri Lanka's digital governance framework. It aligns Sri Lanka's data protection regime with international standards, potentially facilitating cross-border data flows and digital trade. The Act is expected to enhance trust in digital transactions and services while promoting responsible data handling practices across public and private sectors.

== See also ==
- Online Safety Act (Sri Lanka)
- General Data Protection Regulation
- Information privacy
- Privacy law
