= Jack Jackson Jr. =

American politician

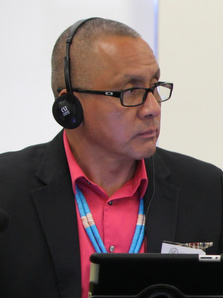
- Jackson in 2013

Member of the Arizona Senate from the 2nd district
- In office January 10, 2011 – July 1, 2013
- Preceded by: Albert Hale
- Succeeded by: Carlyle Begay

Member of the Arizona House of Representatives from the 2nd district
- In office January 12, 2003 – January 10, 2005

Personal details
- Born: Navajo Nation, Arizona
- Party: Democratic

Jack C. Jackson Jr. (Navajo) is an American attorney and politician from Arizona. A Democrat, he served in the Arizona Senate, representing the state's 2nd district in northern Arizona from 2011 until July 2013, when he left for an appointment with the U.S. Department of State. He is a former member of the Arizona House of Representatives, having served from January 2003 to January 2005.

His father, Jack C. Jackson Sr., served in the Arizona House until 2004, and they were the first father and son to serve together in the state legislature. In 2004, Jackson Jr. declined to seek a second House term.

== Personal life and education ==
Jack C. Jackson Jr. was born on the Navajo Nation, into his mother's Tó’áhaní (Near The Water) clan and born for his father's Kinyaa’áanii (Towering House) clan. His maternal grandfather is from the Tábaahá (Water’s Edge) clan, and his paternal grandfather is from the Áshiihí (Salt) clan. His father, Jack Jackson Sr., had a long political career, serving in the State Legislature from 1985 to 2004.

Jackson Jr. graduated from college and went on to earn his J.D. degree from Syracuse University College of Law in New York in 1989. That year, he moved to Washington, D.C., and began his career in Native American political advocacy.

== Political career ==
Jackson moved to the capital, where he represented tribal governments and organizations, primarily before the federal government. Beginning as a Legislative Associate, he advanced to Deputy Director for the Navajo Nation Washington Office. Jackson also served as a Legislative Analyst at the National Indian Education Association and as the Director of Governmental Affairs for the National Congress of American Indians. In total, he worked in Washington for 12 years. In April 2000, Secretary of Health and Human Services Donna Shalala appointed him to President Bill Clinton’s Advisory Council on HIV/AIDS.

In 2002, Jackson Jr. successfully ran for the Arizona State House of Representatives. He served one term from January 2003 to January 2005 in the 46th Arizona State Legislature. During this time, he worked alongside his father, Jack C. Jackson Sr., who served in the Arizona State Legislature from 1985 to 2004. They became the first father and son to serve simultaneously in the Arizona State Legislature.

In 2005, Arizona Governor Janet Napolitano appointed Jackson as the Executive Director of the Arizona Commission of Indian Affairs, an office that assists Arizona's 22 Indian Nations and Tribes. That year, Jackson also began his campaign for the U.S. House of Representatives in Arizona's 1st congressional district, a seat held by the Republican Rick Renzi. In March 2006, he withdrew from the House campaign ahead of the September Democratic primary, citing his campaign's inability to raise sufficient funds to compete against the incumbent. Renzi retained his seat in the November election.

In 2010, Jackson Jr. ran for the Arizona Senate in the Legislative District 2 and won the August Democratic primary, defeating three other candidates. He was unopposed in the general election since no Republican filed for the seat. As a result, in November 2010, Jackson reclaimed his father's former Senate seat in the 50th Arizona Legislature. Due to Arizona's 2002 redistricting, in 2010, Arizona Legislative District 2 included part of the city of Flagstaff, the Navajo Nation, and the Hopi, Havasupai, Hualapai and San Juan Southern Paiute tribes.

In the 2012 election, Jackson ran unopposed. Subsequently, he was re-elected to represent the newly drawn Arizona Legislative District 7, which, in 2011, incorporated all of the state's northern tribes: Hualapai, Havasupai, Kaibab Paiute, Navajo, Hopi, and Zuni Pueblo, as well as the White Mountain and San Carlos Apache reservations.

Jackson served on the Navajo Nation Gaming Enterprise Board from October 2007 to August 2014. During his tenure on the board, Navajo Gaming established the Navajo Nations first two casinos.

The Obama Administration appointed Jackson to serve again on the President’s Advisory Council on HIV/AIDS, holding this position from February 2010 to September 2013. In support of same-sex marriage, he introduced legislation in 2013 to change the marriage provision in Arizona's state Constitution that defines marriage as between one man and one woman. However, the legislation failed due to a conservative state legislature.

During the Biden Administration, he was appointed as a Tribal Liaison in the Office of Congressional and Intergovernmental Affairs at the Department of Labor. In 2024, he was appointed to the FCC.

== Personal ==
Jackson is gay. On October 11, 2008, in Del Mar, California, before the passage of Proposition 8, Jackson was married to db Bailey in a sunset ceremony.
