= Australian Indigenous College =

Former college for Indigenous Australian students

- Active: August 2014–February 2016
- Director: Annette Simpson
- Location: Queensland, Australia
- Campus: Goodna, Rockhampton

Australian Indigenous College (AIC) was an Australian college for Aboriginal and Torres Strait Islander students that existed over two campuses in Queensland between August 2014 and February 2016.

== Founding ==
The college was founded in Goodna, near Ipswich in August 2014, located at the St Ives shopping centre. There were over 100 expressions of interest lodged in the Diploma of Business, and there were already plans for a second campus to be opened elsewhere in February.

The Rockhampton campus opened in December 2015. It was intended that a tutor from the college would visit Woorabinda, Gladstone, Biloela and Yeppoon, and set up study groups.

== Description ==
The college had campuses in Goodna, a suburb of Ipswich, and Rockhampton. (Note: NITV source says Brisbane, but assume this is the Goodna campus.)

The college's teaching model incorporated an "eight-way learning method" which included story-telling, community links, non-verbal learning and learning maps. The college signed a charter with Indigenous Elders of the Jagera people, which recognised and supported the college and its values. Courses were offered at diploma level, but it did not gain accreditation as a registered training organisation (RTO).

== Financial troubles ==
On 9 February 2016, the Australian Indigenous College, along with other colleges operated by Global Intellectual Holdings collapsed, resulting in students being left with significant debt and employees being locked out.
