= AIC (gene) =

Genetic element in humans

Identifiers
- Aliases: AIC, Aicardi syndrome
- External IDs: GeneCards: AIC; OMA:AIC - orthologs
Orthologs
Species	Human	Mouse
Entrez	192	n/a
Ensembl	n/a	n/a
UniProt	n a	n/a
RefSeq (mRNA)	n/a	n/a
RefSeq (protein)	n/a	n/a
Location (UCSC)	n/a	n/a
PubMed search		n/a
- Wikidata
View/Edit Human

Aicardi syndrome is a protein that in humans is encoded by the AIC gene.
