= Asia Internet Coalition =

Trade association

The Asia Internet Coalition (AIC) was a trade association co-founded by eBay, Google, Nokia, Skype, and Yahoo! in 2010. AIC lobbies government agencies to address public policy issues and facilitate the development of the internet economy in the Asia Pacific region.

== Membership ==
As of February 2021, AIC's membership includes Apple, Facebook, Google, Expedia Group, Amazon, Line, LinkedIn, Rakuten, SAP, Airbnb, Grab, Twitter, Yahoo, Booking.com, and Cloudfare.

== Policy positions ==
In November 2020, AIC issued a statement expressing "alarm" at social media rules proposed by the Pakistani government, threatening to leave the Pakistani market if the regulations were passed.

In February 2021, AIC issued a statement expressing its deep concerns with a proposed cybersecurity bill in the aftermath of the 2021 Myanmar coup d'état. Jeff Paine, AIC's managing director, noted "The military’s proposed bill grants its leaders unprecedented power to censor citizens and violate their privacy, contravening democratic norms and fundamental rights guaranteed under international law. This would significantly undermine freedom of expression and represents a regressive step after years of progress."

In June 2021, AIC issued a statement expressing concerns about the proposed anti-doxxing-related changes to data-protection laws in Hong Kong. In a letter to Hong Kong’s Privacy Commissioner for Personal Data, Jeff Paine, AIC's managing director, suggested that the proposed amendments could mean that Internet firms and their staff based locally in Hong Kong could be subject to criminal investigations and prosecution for doxxing offences by their users, and warned that "the only way to avoid these sanctions for technology companies would be to refrain from investing and offering their services in Hong Kong."
