= Arizona International College =

Former liberal arts college in Tucson, Arizona

- Type: liberal arts
- Active: 1996–2005
- Provost: Paul Rosenblatt
- Location: Tucson, Arizona

Arizona International College (AIC) was an American liberal arts college in Tucson, Arizona, that existed from 1996–2005.

== Background ==
In the 1990s Arizona's public university system hosted two large public universities in Tucson and Phoenix (University of Arizona and Arizona State University), the smaller Northern Arizona University in Flagstaff, and a number of community colleges. There was no teaching-intensive, liberal arts college. In 1990, the Arizona Board of Regents (ABOR) began exploring the establishment of a liberal arts institution, in part due to anticipated growth in student numbers in the state. A formal proposal was made in 1994.

AIC was established as "Arizona International University" in an old IBM plant in Eastern Tucson, where the University of Arizona hoped to later establish a research park, and began to admit students in 1996. Seven faculty were hired, on one-year contracts only, working under a Provost, the sociologist Celestino Fernández. Fernández returned to his tenured position at the University of Arizona after a year of poor results, and was replaced at AIC by Paul Rosenblatt.

== Reorganisation ==
After two more years of low enrollments, a re-organisation took place and AIU was renamed as a "College". In summer of 1998, AIC lost its independent status and became a college of the University of Arizona. AIC was relocated to a building near the UofA campus on East Helen Street. This was to benefit from economies of scale - facilities for students and administration procedures could be shared with the main campus operations.

== Curriculum ==
By 1999 a liberal arts curriculum with personalized plans of study was attracting more students. Details from the 2000-2001 Academic Catalog show sixteen faculty members teaching the following degree concentrations Arizona International College, UA Catalog:

- Fine & Performing Arts (B.A.)
- Humanities (B.A.)
- Language & Culture (B.A.)
- Liberal Studies (B.A.)
- Natural Sciences & Mathematics (B.A.)
- Social Sciences (B.A.)

Students began with "On Becoming a Fully Educated Person" Other core classes were "Critical Writing and Communication", "Introduction to Global Perspectives", "Statistical Techniques for Problems of the Modern World", "Human Consciousness and the Formation of World Views", and a Symposium. Second language and regional study was required. After completing the core, students worked with faculty advisors to design an individual course of study. They also had to satisfy competency in six essential skills, and complete two supervised internships. There were established student exchange relationships with colleges in Mexico, Canada and elsewhere. The student experience was reported as positive.

According to the Catalog, "AIC prepares students for rich personal, professional, and civic lives in an increasingly complex and integrated world. The College accomplishes this mission in good part through a curriculum designed to ensure the development of a global perspective through an interdisciplinary study of the Liberal Arts and the improvement of specific skills and competencies. AIC is characterized by small classes and frequent faculty/student interaction, required service-learning and career internships, and a senior capstone project allowing students to integrate their undergraduate experience with future educational and/or career goals.". AIC stood for "Academics, Innovation, Community".

== The end ==
Plans to eventually co-locate AIC with a branch of Pima Community College, in northern Tucson, were mooted but never came to fruition.

The President of The University of Arizona, Peter Likins, "disestablished" Arizona International College in November 2001, just five years after it opened its doors, at the height of severe budget shortfalls in Arizona following the 9-11 attacks and the US fiscal crisis. A program of cuts called "Focused Excellence" was the pretext, along with the claim that too many AIC students tended to transfer to UofA to complete their degrees after their sophomore year. The decision to close was ratified by the Arizona Board of Regents. Strong student protests to keep the College open and to support the faculty were unsuccessful. Existing contracts for the Faculty, some of them lasting until the mid-2000s, were honored (but there were no extensions thereafter). Some continued offering classes until 2005 when the last student graduated. AIC students were 'taught out', although the majority eventually transferred to other faculties at the University of Arizona to complete their degrees.

Former AIC Professor Kali Tal notes that although the budget crisis in Arizona was real, AIC was an easy target for closure because none of the faculty had tenure and therefore could easily be dismissed (she does not mention the loss of students to UofA, however).

== Criticisms ==
AIC suffered from its position vis a vis the established Arizona state university system. The faculty in particular felt unsecure, and it took protests at the end of the first year (organised by Kali Tal who was denied a contract renewal), for them to obtain multi-year contracts with advanced notice of termination. Opinion differed on the lack of tenure, with former faculty member Paul Burkhardt saying "I believe that the faculty evaluation, reward, and multi-year contract system served AIC faculty well."

With hindsight, it appears AIC was established with the aim of offering liberal arts education without adequate recognition of the costs - intensive teaching, small classes, and internships were expensive to operate. The quality of the teaching was good, but only temporary contracts with relatively low pay were offered initially, and the faculty had high teaching loads. There was little or no support to them at the end of their contracts. The main University of Arizona campus was generally hostile to the new upstart institution, intervening to 'manage' it on several occasions. Student numbers were not given a chance to build to sustainable levels before closure was announced. Because AIC was a public institution, there were constraints on increasing student fees to support rising costs.

Tal said "It would, however, be a case of weeping crocodile tears were I to lament AIC's passing too loudly: at root, the college made promises to students and faculty that were impossible to fulfill. The bottom line is that one can't provide a quality liberal arts education to students on the cheap, even by grossly exploiting the college's faculty."

== Legacy ==
There have been no efforts to repeat the AIC model in Arizona. Perhaps the closest alternative is the private Prescott College in Prescott, AZ, which preceded AIC and offers a liberal arts model with progressive teaching approaches.

Some AIC faculty left academia or retired. The exceptions include founding AIC faculty member Melissa Fitch, who is a University Distinguished Professor at the University of Arizona, Jude Fernando, now Associate Professor of International Development at Clark University, and Paul Burkhardt, formerly Provost at Prescott College and in 2022 moving to Olivet College. In 2022 Joisane Peltier was teaching French at Aalto University in Finland. Kali Tal is an editor and researcher at the University of Bern in Switzerland. Edwin Clausen left in 2000 for Daemen College in Amherst, NY and became its President from 2011 to 2013 before leaving higher education.
