= ECU'92 =

Economie Cominatie Utrecht 1992
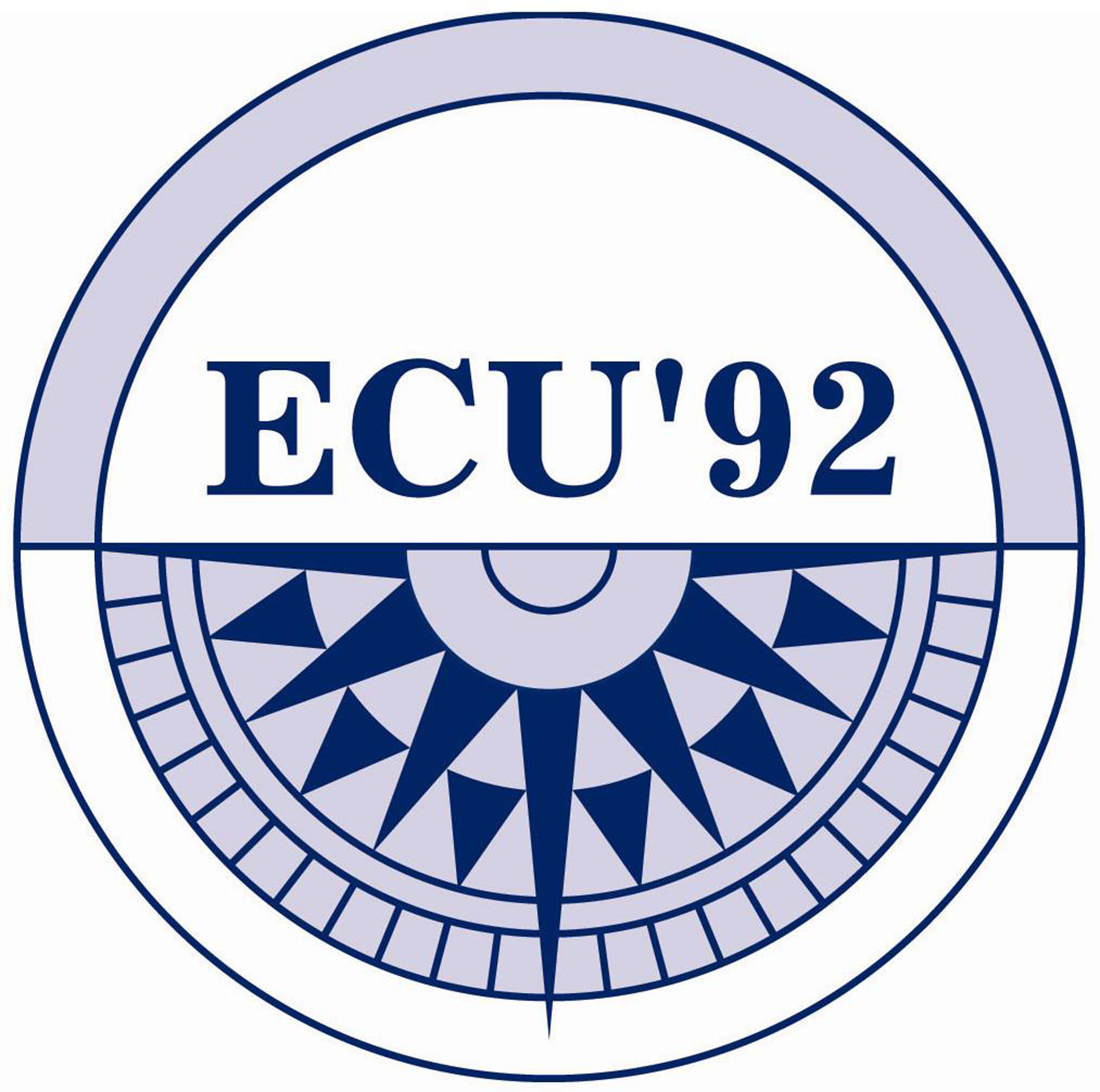
- Abbreviation: ECU’92
- Type: Study Association
- Website: http://ecu92.nl/

ECU’92 (Economie Combinatie Utrecht 1992) is the study association for all economics and business economics students at the faculty Law, Economics and Governance (REBO) at the Utrecht University. With over 1550 members, of which 100 participate in one of the 21 committees, ECU’92 is among the largest study associations of Utrecht. The association aims to represent the interests of its members and expand their understanding of the economy and also all that is (in)directly related or can enhance the understanding of the economy in general. The association fulfils this goal by the organization of a diversity of social, content and career-related events.

== History ==
Initiated by the faculties of social sciences and geography, an economics project in Utrecht was started in the academic year 1991/1992. As a result, on March 24, 1992, Economie Combinatie Utrecht 1992 was founded during the first general meeting in the Bondsraadzaal of the National Labourunion museum.

Over the years, ECU’92 has grown from a small association to one of the largest study associations in Utrecht. With the founding of the Utrecht University School of Economics (USE), the Utrecht University starts an independent Economics programme in the year 2000. The establishment of USE creates a large increase in the number of members of ECU’92. Supported by the programme, ECU’92 becomes from this moment on more and more professional. The professionalization and the increase in the number of members ensure that in 2003 a second ECU'92 room is assigned to the University College campus, building U. Meanwhile, the other room of ECU'92 moved through Pnyx and Vredenburg to Janskerkhof. In 2011 the now renamed Business & Economics study moves entirely to the University College campus. The second ECU’92 room is also moved here.

== Board of recommendation ==
The board of recommendation consists of the following people:

- Prof. dr.h.c. Mr. F. Bolkestein
- Drs. Jhr. D. Laman Trip
- Drs. A. Jongerius
- Dr. A.H.G. Rinnooy Kan
- Dr. A.H.E.M. Wellink
- Drs. G. Zalm
- Prof. dr. C.J.M. Kool
- Prof. dr. H.R.B.M. Kummeling
- Mw. Mr. Y.C.M.T. van Rooy
- Prof. dr. E.J.J. Schenk
- Drs. J.G.F. Veldhuis
