= Hans Adriaansens =

Dutch sociologist

Henricus Petrus Maria (Hans) Adriaansens (born 1946, Middelburg) is a Dutch sociologist, and the former dean of Roosevelt Academy, a small liberal arts college in Middelburg, the Netherlands. He is especially known as founder of University College Utrecht (UCU), the first honors college of the Netherlands, as well as Roosevelt Academy itself, now known as University College Roosevelt (UCR).

== Education ==
Hans Adriaansens attended gymnasium in Breda and graduated cum laude in sociology at the Tilburg University. After a stay at Harvard University, he also completed his doctoral dissertation cum laude at Tilburg University.

== Education Innovator ==
Unhappy with the undemanding and large scale climate of university education in the Netherlands, Professor Hans Adriaansens started developing the idea of a small scale and academically intensive undergraduate college in the Netherlands. This resulted in University College Utrecht in 1998 and in the Roosevelt Academy, now known as University College Roosevelt, in 2004.

== Membership of organizations ==
Having retired from his job as dean of the Roosevelt Academy, Professor Adriaansens currently serves as chairman of the Board of Trustees of the Antonius-Mesos Group and of two hospitals in the Utrecht region. He is also a member of the Board of Trustees of both the Hogeschool van Utrecht and the Hogeschool Zeeland. He furthermore participates in various government committees in the field of higher education and social development. He is also a part-time member of the Dutch National Dance Association, although due to his busy schedule as Dean of Roosevelt Academy he has not been able to pursue his love as much as he would like.

== Awards ==
In 2002 Adriaansens was awarded the silver medal of Utrecht University for university innovation. In 2004 he became officer in the Order of Orange-Nassau.

== Publications. a selection ==
- Hans P.M. Adriaansens. Talcott Parsons and the Conceptual Dilemma (RLE Social Theory). First published in English in 1980 by Routledge & Kegan Paul Ltd.
- Adriaansens, Hans PM. Algemene sociologie. Vuga, 1983.

Articles, a selection

- Adriaansens, Hans PM. "The conceptual dilemma: towards a better understanding of the development in Parsonian action-theory." British Journal of Sociology (1979): 5-24.
- Adriaansens, Hans PM. "Talcott Parsons and Beyond: Recollections of an Outsider." Theory, Culture & Society 6.4 (1989): 613-621.
