= King of the Channel =

King of the Channel may refer to:

- King of the Channel (swimming)
- King of the Channel (rowing)
