= Utrecht University School of Economics =

University in Utrecht, Netherlands

Utrecht University School of Economics (USE)
- Chair: Prof. Niels Bosma
- Students: 1,400
- Location: Kriekenpitplein 21-22, Utrecht, 3584EC, Netherlands, Utrecht, Netherlands
- Website: http://www.uu.nl/use

Utrecht University School of Economics (USE) is the Economics department of Utrecht University, in the Netherlands.

The department is divided into three different units:

- the Undergraduate School of Economics, which offers bachelor’s programmes
- the Graduate School of Economics
- the Tjalling C. Koopmans Research Institute (TKI), which conducts academic research and supervises research master's programmes (MPhil).

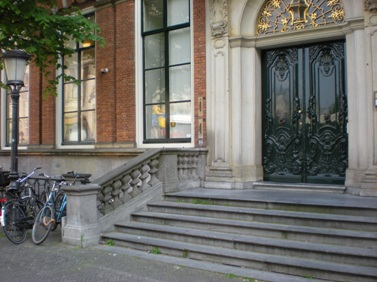
USE old address (Janskerkhof)

== Programmes ==
=== Bachelors ===
==== BSc in Economics and Business Economics ====
The Bsc in Economics and Business Economics is a three-year programme taught in English. In the three-year bachelor's programme, all students will start with a number of basic courses that together constitute the required part of the curriculum. After completing these courses they can specialize in a subject of their choice: Financial-Monetary Economics, Business & Management, International Economics, Labour & Organisation, Economics & Politics or the Firm and Competition Apart from this, USE offers a unique curriculum, giving students the opportunity to combine their study of Economics with especially compiled courses in Law, Social Sciences, Geography, Psychology or History.

=== Masters ===
==== MSc in Economics of Public Policy and Management ====
Source.

- Economic Policy
- Economics and Data Analysis

==== MSc in International Economics and Business ====
- Banking and Finance
- Business and Social Impact
- Business Development and Entrepreneurship
- Financial Management
- International Management
- Sustainable Finance and Investments

==== MSc in Multidisciplinary Economics (Research) ====
The Tjalling C. Koopmans Research Institute provides one final research Master in Multidisciplinary economics.

== Exchange Programmes ==
The Utrecht University School of Economics has exchange agreements with 27 partner universities.

== Study Association ==
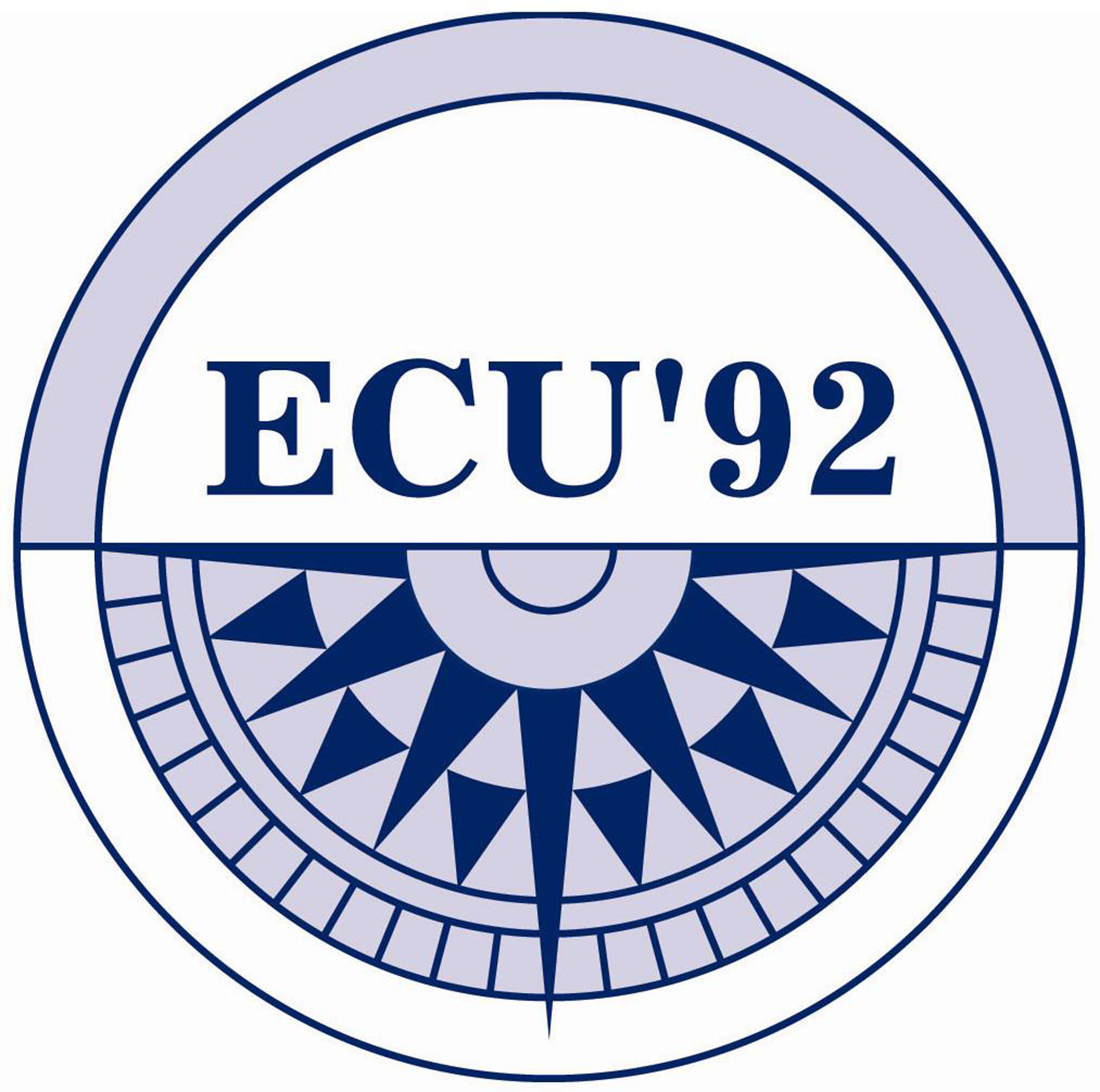
ECU'92 Logo

ECU'92 is the study organization for all students who study economics at USE. They represent students, participate in the decision-making of the department and organize social, academic and career related events, often in partnership with the university. It is one of the largest study associations in Utrecht. The association has about 1800 members, approximately 130 of which are active in committees. Important political figures or executives have attended the ECU'92 conference throughout the years. Job fairs offer a convenient place for USE students to meet Dutch companies and get a first interview. Finally, ECU'92 publishes The Ecunomist, which name is a nod to the British weekly magazine The Economist.

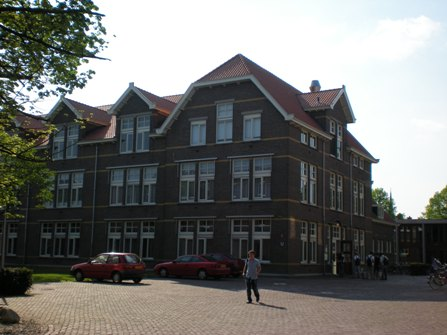
USE (UCU Campus)
