= The Roosevelt Academy Graduate School of Music =

College in the Netherlands

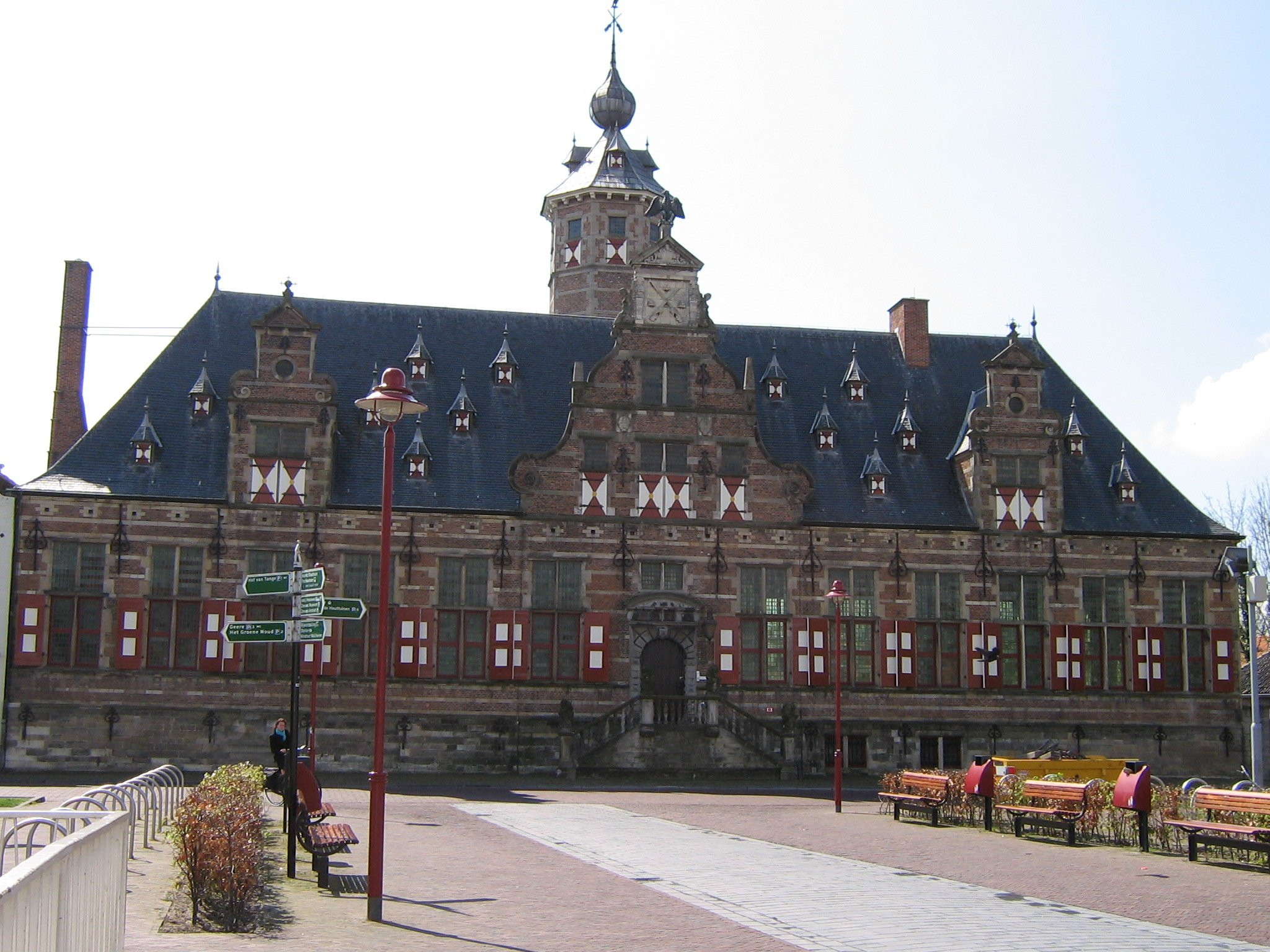
Roosevelt Academy Kloveniersdoelen

The Roosevelt Academy Graduate School of Music is a planned graduate program at Roosevelt Academy, a liberal arts college in Middelburg, Netherlands. It will combine music practice with music theory, leading to M.A. degree in Music. a It is planned to house the Roosevelt Academy Graduate School of Music in the Kloveniersdoelen building.
