= King of the Channel (dragon boat) =

Dutch dragon boat race

The King of the Channel (KOTC) is a yearly dragon boat race in the Netherlands between University College Roosevelt (UCR); the Hogeschool Zeeland (HZ) and Scalda represented by CIOS Goes. Although not a real rowing race, the concept mimics the well known Boat Race.

== History ==
The specific structure of the event has changed over the years. The 2011 edition of the KOTC involved three events. The first was a dragon boat race between UCR, HZ, and ROC. The second was a businesslike race with 4 person boats. The final race was between HZ and UCR.

== Results ==
- 2005: HZ wins in longboat
- 2006: RA wins in dragonboat, HZ wins in longboat
- 2007: HZ wins in dragonboat
- 2008: HZ wins in dragonboat
- 2009:
- 2010: HZ wins in dragonboat, RA wins in longboat
- 2011: RA wins in longboat and dragonboat
- 2018: CIOS Goes Wins overall, student of Sport Coordinator uniformed profession and students outdoor instructor
