= Hans Schenk (economist) =

Dutch academic

E.J.J. Schenk (publishing under the names of Emile or Hans) is a Dutch professor emeritus of economics and fellow of the Tjalling C. Koopmans Research Institute at Utrecht University’s School (NE) of Economics (USE) of which he was founding director. He was a Crown-appointed independent member of the Social and Economic Council SER of the Netherlands from 2010 until 2018. With other financial economics specialists, and help of Triodos Bank, he founded the Sustainable Finance Lab in 2011.

Before accepting the professorship at USE, he was a professor of economics and business at Tilburg University (NE) and an associate professor at Erasmus University Rotterdam (NE) and the University of Groningen (NE).

== Biography ==
=== Work ===
Schenk graduated from the University of Oregon (US), obtained his MBA in the collaborative Leuven/Cornell programme and his doctorate in economics from Université de Nice-Sophia Antipolis (FR). He has held chairs at several foreign institutions, among which the China-Europe Management Institute in Beijing and Université Louis Pasteur in Strasbourg (FR). He was a fellow of the Centre for International Business and Management when it was at Cambridge University between 2005-2015, after which he became an academic associate .

He was a consultant to multinational enterprises, employers’ federations as well as trade unions, the United Nations, the Dutch and English parliaments, the European Commission, and the governments of the Netherlands, Vietnam and South Africa. He directed the family business firm in Maastricht (NE) for five years and acts on various supervisory boards.

He has been chief advisor to the Royal Dutch Economic Society and is an associate editor of the International Journal of the Economics of Business and the International Review of Applied Economics.

The Economist qualified him as “the internationally most reputable Dutch economist” in 1993. He was a nominated recipient of Le Monde's Science Award in 1998 while Edward Elgar's Who's Who in the Management Sciences (2000) selected him as one of seven Dutch entries among the world's 350 leading business scholars.

His work is being quoted frequently in Dutch newspapers while he appeared regularly on radio and TV news programmes. Abroad, he was interviewed for media such as Canadian Public TV, Newsweek, The Guardian, The Wall Street Journal, and the China Business Times.

== Schematic view ==
=== Auxiliary positions ===
- Member (Chairman) Supervisory Board, Novadic-Kentron, Vught; since 2022
- Member Supervisory Board, FNSteel BV, Alblasserdam; since 2021
- Chairman of the Board, GRASP Research (prev. Erasmus University Rotterdam); since 1987
- Member (Chairman) Supervisory Board, Zorg van de Zaak Netwerk BV, Utrecht; since 2018 (2022)

=== Previous positions ===
- Chairman of the Board, Professor F. de Vries Foundation; 2014-2024
- Member (Chairman) Supervisory Board/President, Transdev Nederland Holding NV, Amsterdam/Hilversum; 2010/2019-2023
- Chairman Advisory Board, IntegrationPeople BV, Almere; 2019-2023
- Member Supervisory Board, Wehkamp Holding BV, Zwolle; since 2013
- Member Supervisory Board, SSH, Utrecht (2012-2016)
- Fellow, NETSPAR, Tilburg University (2010-2014)
- Member Supervisory Board, British American Tobacco Europe, Amsterdam (2007–2010)
- Fellow, ENCORE, University of Amsterdam (2006-2010)
- Expert associate, Danish Technological Institute (2004–2007)
- Member, advisory board Deloitte & Touche FAS, Amsterdam (2003–2007)
- Founding member, executive committee, and founding director of the Tjalling C. Koopmans Research Institute, Utrecht School of Economics, Utrecht University (2002–2007)
- Professor of industrial policy, Tilburg University (1996–2002)
- Associate member of the Mergers Review Committee, Social and Economic Council of the Netherlands (SER), The Hague (1999–2002)
- Director of studies, Tias Business School, Tilburg University (1996–1998)
- Professeur en Théorie de la Firme, Faculté des Sciences Economiques et de Gestion, Université Louis Pasteur, Strasbourg (1993–1996)
- Associate professor of Strategic Management, Erasmus University Rotterdam (1986–1993)
- Professor of International Business, China-Europe Management Institute/EFMD (now CEIBS), Beijing (Shanghai)/Brussels (1991–1993)
- Visiting professorial fellow of Industrial Economics, Department of Economics, University of Warwick, Coventry (1992)
- Senior advisor, United Nations, Vienna (1988–1990)
- Visiting professor of industrial policy, International University Institute, Luxembourg (1990)
- Managing director, Emile Schenk Construction Services Ltd, Maastricht (1982–1986)
- Assistant/associate professor of Operations Management, Faculty of Economics, University of Groningen (1974–1982)

=== Education ===
Economics as well as business at Nyenrode University (NL), University of Oregon (US); MBA from University of Leuven (B); Economics doctorate from Université de Nice-Sophia Antipolis (F)

=== Scholarly affiliations ===
- Associate editor of International Journal of the Economics of Business (since 1992);
- Associate editor of International Review of Applied Economics (since 1992);
- Past member steering committee, ‘European Network on Industrial Policy’ (EUNIP; 1994–2002)
- Past member executive committee, European Association for Research in Industrial Economics (EARIE; 1986–1992);
- Past member editorial committee, Economisch Statistische Berichten (2004-2015);
- Past founding editor of Tijdschrift voor Politieke Ekonomie (1977–2002)

=== Miscellaneous ===
Acted as consultant to multinational enterprises, Dutch ministries, the governments of Vietnam and South Africa, UNCTAD, UNI-Europa, trade unions, and employers' federations. Past member of the Industrial Policy Committee of the SER and various other official committees. Organiser of several conferences, most recently on ‘Governance of the Modern Firm'. Led the academic supporting team of the De Wit Committee of the Dutch Parliament which studied the causes of, and policy responses to the 2008 financial crisis.

=== Research ===
- Eight books (Elsevier; Wolters-Noordhoff; Stenfert Kroese; Lemma; Kluwer; Springer); two special journal issues
- More than 80 scholarly papers in a.o. TPE; ESB; De Economist; Maandschrift Economie; Empirica; Int. Rev. Appl. Econ., J. Publ. Issues, J. Evol. Econ., and in edited volumes published by North-Holland; Manchester University Press; Routledge; Kluwer; Edward Elgar; Scriptum; Sage
- Many business or government sponsored extensive research reports and professional articles

=== Awards/citations ===
- Awarded honorary membership of the economics students association ECU'92 at Utrecht University, 2015
- Selected chief pre-advisor to the Royal Dutch Economic Society, 2001
- Selected one of the world’s 350, and the Netherlands’s 7, leading scholars in management, see Cooper, Who’s Who in the Management Sciences, 2000; and Economisch Statistische Berichten, 22 December 2000
- Nominated recipient of the Le Monde University Research Award 1998 (with CIC Bank)
- Most frequently cited scholar of Tilburg University in Dutch & foreign media, 1996-2001
- Considered “the internationally most reputable Dutch economist” by the Economist in 1993
- Teaching awards from Erasmus University, Tilburg University and Utrecht University.
