= Utrecht Summer School =

The Utrecht Summer School, founded by Utrecht University in 1987, is the largest academic summer programme in the Netherlands and belongs to the bigger summer schools in Europe. About 3000 students from all over the world participate in one of the roughly 160 courses offered in July and August. Utrecht Summer School is a cooperation between Utrecht University, University Medical Center Utrecht, Utrecht University of Applied Sciences, Utrecht School of the Arts, University of Humanistic Studies. In 2021, Utrecht Summer School celebrated its 35th anniversary.

== History ==
The summer school started with one course: Dutch Culture and Society, which is still one of the most popular courses. Over the past decades the programme has developed into a broad selection of courses in many of the disciplines which Utrecht University and its partner institutions are offering. Most courses are hosted on location. Some courses are offered online.

== Disciplines ==
The courses are divided in the following categories:

- Humanities, e.g. European Politics and Economy, The Making of Europe
- Art & Music, e.g. Highlights of European Art History, Golden Age of Dutch Art
- Social Sciences, e.g. Conflict Studies, Migration, Data Science, Futuring for Sustainability
- Business & Economics, e.g. Innovation in European Business, Project Management, Leadership for Innovation
- Science, e.g. Mathematics, Geometry, Theoretical Physics
- Life Sciences, e.g. Food safety, Biomedical Research, Pharmacoepidemiology
- Law, e.g. Law, EU Law, Human Rights Law, Law and Economics
- Healthcare, e.g. Healthy Aging, Regenerative Medicine
- Language, e.g. Dutch, English, Chinese Language, Psycholinguistics

== Accommodation ==
Utrecht Summer School offers (optional) temporary housing in furnished student dorms. The dorms are located in the city centre, at the Utrecht Science Park and at the International Campus Utrecht.

== Social programme ==
Utrecht Summer School offers a social programme for all participants. The programme contains night canoeing through the canals of downtown Utrecht, a walk through Amelisweerd, a pub quiz, bowling night and a scavenger hunt. They can even join ringing the bells of the Dom Tower on a Sunday morning!
