= Zeeland Library =

Official library of Zeeland, Netherlands

Coordinates: 51.4963°N 3.6158°E

- Zeeuwse Bibliotheek
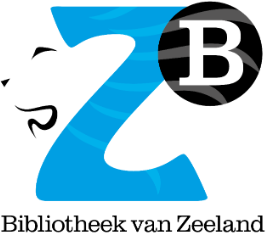

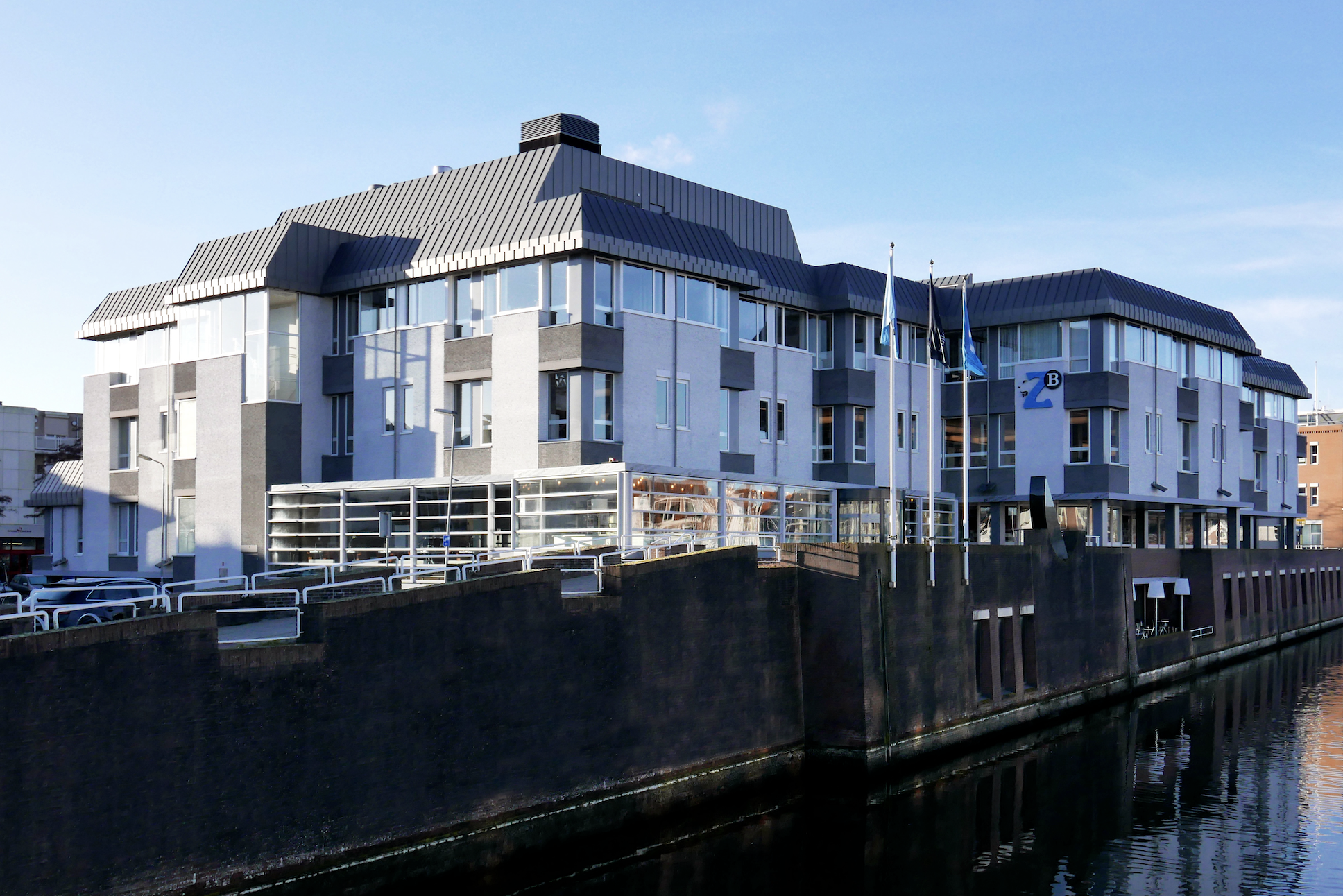
- Logo ZB Bibliotheek van Zeeland
- Location: Kousteensedijk 7, Middelburg, Netherlands
- Type: Public, Academic
- Established: 1985

Collection
- Size: about 2,000,000 books

Access and use
- Circulation: 632,401 (2023)
- Members: 40,396 (2023)

Other information
- Employees: 173 and 125 volunteers (2023)
- Website: www.dezb.nl

ZB Bibliotheek van Zeeland, the Zeeland Library (Zeeuwse Bibliotheek) in Middelburg, Netherlands, is the largest cultural institution of the province of Zeeland and fulfills the task of public library for Middelburg, scientific library for Zeeland (it is a WSF-library) and the academic library of University College Roosevelt. It also has the function of Provincial Library Central for libraries, schools and institutions in the province.

== History ==
The library was founded in 1985, when scientific, provisional, public, and specialized libraries were merged into one, creating the largest cultural institution in Zeeland and one of the Netherlands major libraries.

== Books and services ==
The library employs 170 staff and lends about 632,000 publications annually. It serves as a provincial service organization, advising institutions and other libraries, offering specialized services in all book-related areas.

Zeeland Library stages and develops cultural events, shows, and educational programs.

== Opening hours ==
Zeeland Regional Library opens from:

- 09:00 am – 17:00 pm on Mondays, Wednesdays and Fridays
- 09:00 am – 20:00 pm Tuesdays and Thursdays
- 09:00 am – 16:00 pm Saturdays

The library is closed on Sundays.
