= University College Roosevelt =

Liberal arts and science college in Middelburg, Netherlands

- Former name: Roosevelt Academy (2004-2013)
- Motto: Iuventum Futuro Aedificare
- Motto in English: "Building Our Youth for the Future"
- Type: Undergraduate liberal arts college
- Established: 2004
- Founder: Hans Adriaansens
- Parent institution: University Utrecht
- Dean: Prof. dr. Gerda Andringa
- Director: Etienne de Jager
- Academic staff: ~60
- Administrative staff: ~20
- Students: ~500
- Undergraduates: ~500
- Location: Lange Noordstraat 1, Middelburg, Zeeland, 4331CB, Netherlands; 51°29′57″N 3°36′39″E
- Campus: Urban
- Language: English (US)
- Colors: Dark purple
- Nickname: Vikings
- Mascot: Teddy
- Website: www.ucr.nl

University College Roosevelt (UCR), formerly known as Roosevelt Academy (RA), is a small, honors undergraduate liberal arts and science college located in Middelburg in the Netherlands and the sole university in Zeeland. It offers a residential setting, and is an international honors college of Utrecht University. It is named in honour of the Roosevelt family, which traces its ancestry to the province of Zeeland.

== History ==
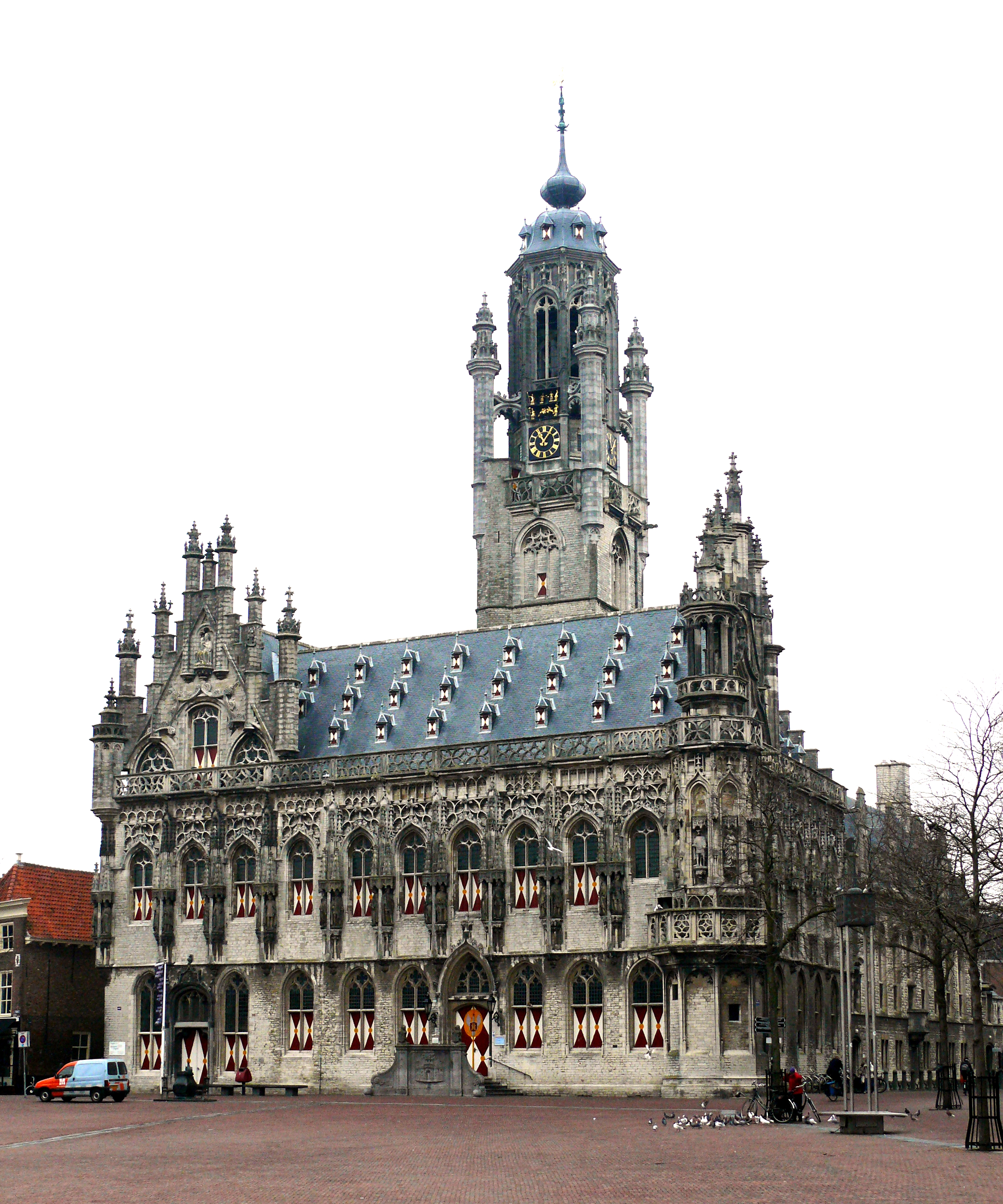
Middelburg's former City Hall, now UCR's main academic building

The Roosevelt Academy, as it was then called, was established in 2004 by Hans Adriaansens, its founding dean. Adriaansens first experienced the ground principles of the liberal arts education during his brief time as a visiting professor at Smith College, USA, in the 1980–1981 academic year. He started to develop the idea of a small scale and academically intensive undergraduate college in the Netherlands, which led Adriaansens to the foundation of University College Utrecht in 1998, the first liberal arts college in the country. After the success of the first University College in Utrecht, Adriaansens started preparations for a sister college in his hometown, Middelburg.

Middelburg and the whole of Zeeland did not have a research university, although William of Orange had considered Middelburg as a possible venue when establishing the first university in the Netherlands in 1575, before ultimately settling for Leiden. Based in Middelburg's former Gothic City Hall, this first college in Zeeland was to be following the same principles of liberal arts education as the Utrecht counterpart. It was named after the Roosevelt family, particularly Franklin, Eleanor and Theodore, due to their ancestry originating in the Dutch province of Zeeland.

The Roosevelt Academy was officially founded on 23 January 2004 and the first students enrolled in August of that year, after Queen Beatrix performed the official opening of the university. It was the third University College to be established in the Netherlands, after University College Utrecht and University College Maastricht. In its first few years, the Roosevelt Academy consistently ranked high among University Colleges: the magazine Elsevier ranked RA as the top liberal arts college in the Netherlands for three times in its first four years, and in 2011 the Keuzengids Onderwijs also ranked it as the number one University College in the Netherlands. Hans Adriaansens retired as dean in November 2011, and was replaced by Prof. Barbara Oomen in April 2012.

On 5 February 2013, Roosevelt Academy changed its name to University College Roosevelt, to avoid ambiguity on the nature of the institution and to present itself explicitly as a university college. UCR kept developing as it entered its second decade. An important milestone was the opening of the Common House Elliott, a building housing classrooms, a student restaurant and a basement bar. After many obstacles, including resistance from the local residents, Elliott opened its doors to the first party on 28 November 2013 and was formally inaugurated in April 2014. In the same year, a Teaching and Learning Centre for excellence in education was established and officially opened by Queen Máxima.

In August 2016, Bert van den Brink became the new dean of UCR. Under van der Brink, UCR expanded its curriculum by establishing a new Engineering Department, piloted from 2019 and officially started in fall 2020. This led to new campus expansions: a new building was acquired to house the new department, and a Joint Research Center (JRI) opened in 2021 in cooperation with the HZ University of Applied Sciences and Scalda, housing labs to be used in the fields of engineering, data sciences, chemistry and ecology.

In 2025, University College Roosevelt underwent a major reorganization. UCR announced a series of austerity measures, including the reduction of more than 25 percent of its staff positions.

As part of the restructuring, UCR overhauled its Liberal Arts and Sciences program, notably cutting many traditional humanities and social science disciplines in favor of business studies and data science. The new curriculum, implemented in the 2025–26 academic year, was reorganized around six interdisciplinary clusters: Business & Entrepreneurship; Media, Culture & Communication; Government & Society; Data Science & Intelligent Systems; Health, Cognition & Behavior; and Environment & Sustainability.

The reorganization prompted widespread protests from students, parents, alumni and faculty, including strikes in early 2025. Some students raised concerns about disrupted study plans and the potential impact on graduate school applications. In April 2025, Professor Gerda Andringa was appointed dean to oversee the implementation of the new strategy.

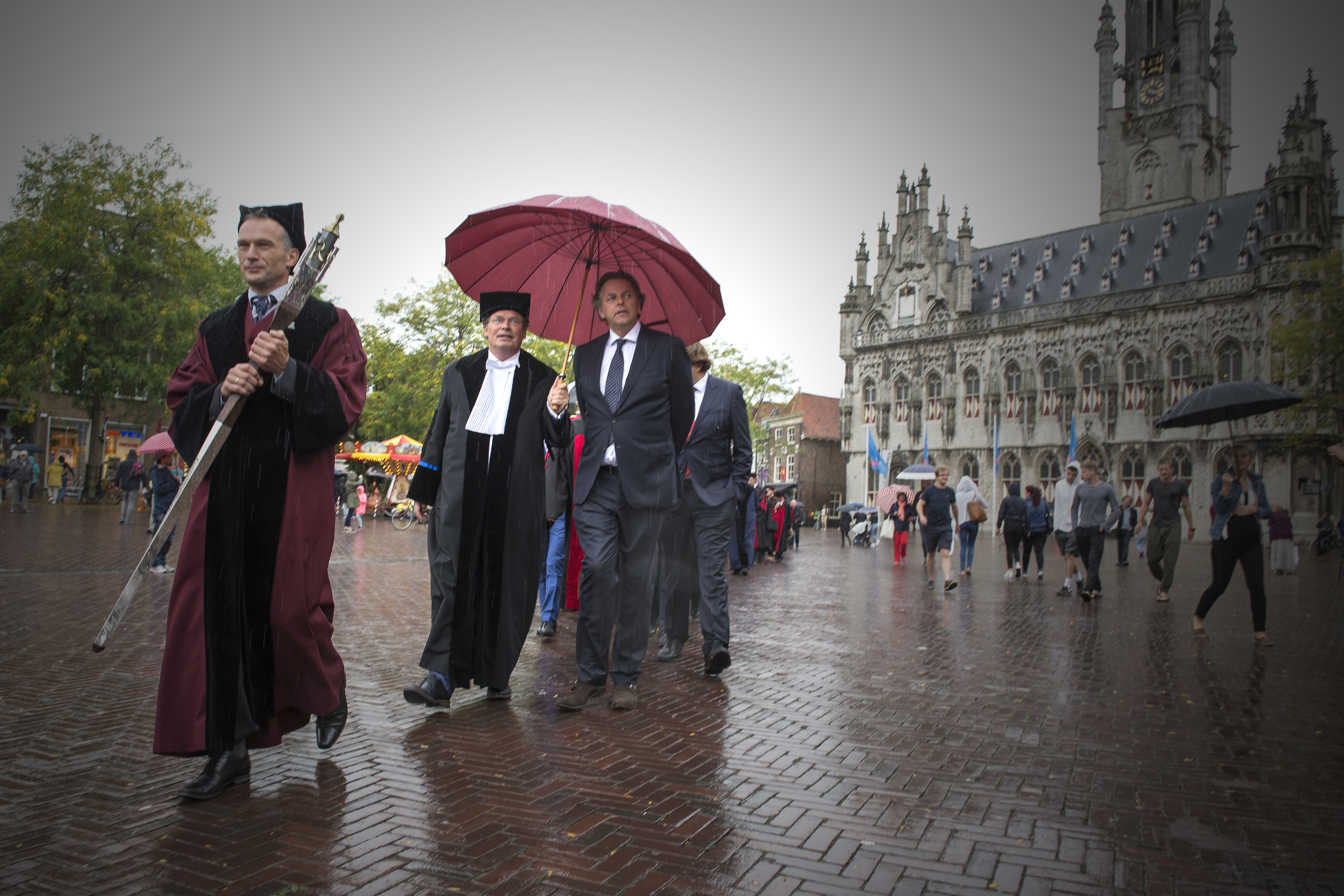
Opening of Academic Year at University College Roosevelt.

=== Deans ===
- Hans Adriaansens (2004–2011)
- Willem Hendrik Gispen (interim dean, 2011–2012)
- Barbara Oomen (2012–2016)
- Bert van den Brink (2016–2022)
- Edward Nieuwenhuis (2023–2024)
- Sjef Smeekens (interim dean, 2024–2025)
- Gerda Andringa (2025–present)

== Academics ==
UCR offers a broad Liberal Arts & Sciences programme with a foundation in academic skills. The students have the freedom to design their own curriculum within certain requirements; they are encouraged and to an extent required to follow classes in different disciplines. Courses have 21 students on average.

After the first year, students are required to declare a major in one of the four departments: Arts & Humanities, Social Sciences, Science or (since 2019) Engineering. An interdepartmental major, combining two or more departments is also possible. Within this curriculum, UCR also offers two special programs: Music Performance, in which students can combine academic studies with performance courses in music, and the Pre-Medical programme, in which students can combine biomedical and life science courses, allowing them to continue their studies in a medical Master course in the Netherlands.

After three years of successful study at UCR, students are awarded an Utrecht University Honors Bachelor of Arts or Bachelor of Science degree, depending on their chosen major.

=== Admissions ===
The university admits 200 students each academic year from about 500-600 applications received. Approximately half of the students come from the Netherlands while the others hail from all over the world. The tuition fee for European students is set at €3,750 for the 2022–2023 academic year, while that of International students is set at €9,450.

=== Accreditation and rankings ===
The NVAO (Dutch-Flemish Accreditation Organization) has been accrediting UCR since its foundation. In 2004, it was awarded an "excellent" status, confirmed with the reaccreditations in 2008 and 2013. In 2019, instead, it was given the overall predicate "good". In addition to its normal accreditation, the NVAO awarded UCR with its "small and intensive" label

In 2011, the Keuzegids Onderwijs ranked UCR as the number one University College in The Netherlands with an 84. In 2012, it fell to second place, with a 78, with University College Maastricht in first place with an 86. As more University Colleges were established in the country, UCR sank in the rankings, reaching the last place among the 10 University Colleges in 2017. Nevertheless, the following year it rose again, ranking 7th out of 10 in 2018 with a 74.

In the 2024 edition of the Keuzegids Onderwijs, UCR is ranked 9th out of the 11 university colleges in the Netherlands.

=== Exchange programs ===
Students may study abroad during their fourth or fifth semester. Students can earn credits towards their UCR degree while at a wide variety of universities around the world. Options include locations through the Utrecht University exchange network, but UCR also has direct exchange agreements with the Honors Program at the University of Nebraska at Kearney, USA, Bard College in New York, USA, and with Glendon College in Toronto, Canada.

=== Academic journal ===
University College Roosevelt publishes an annual academic journal, Ad Astra, that publishes noteworthy student essays and papers.

== Organization ==
University College Roosevelt is an international honors college of Utrecht University. UCR is a financially independent institution of higher education with its own management and board of trustees, while Utrecht University ensures quality control, contributes to the development of the curriculum, and awards the degrees. UCR students are considered to be Utrecht University students and receive a UU degree at the end of their studies. UCR's dean and full professors are all professors at Utrecht University as well.

== Campus ==
=== Academic buildings ===
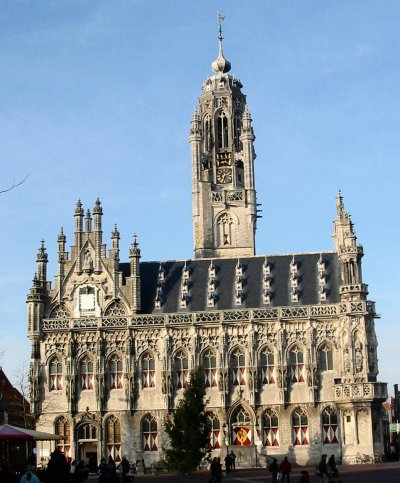
Middelburg City Hall

The University College Roosevelt campus is located near the market square in Middelburg behind the medieval city hall, which was built in 1452 and is often used by the college for ceremonial purposes. The city, which owns the building, began renting the annexed offices to the university college in 2004 after all municipal offices were moved to a new city hall on the Kanaalweg.

The academic buildings are named after prominent members of the Roosevelt Family. The newer, non-gothic section of the city hall is known as Franklin, while the other buildings are called Theodore and Eleanor. These buildings face a square called the Helm and house classrooms and computer labs, as well as faculty and administrative offices.

A new building named Anne, acquired by UCR in 2020, houses its engineering department. This building is named after Anna Eleanor Roosevelt, chair of the Roosevelt Institute and granddaughter of Franklin D. Roosevelt and Eleanor Roosevelt.

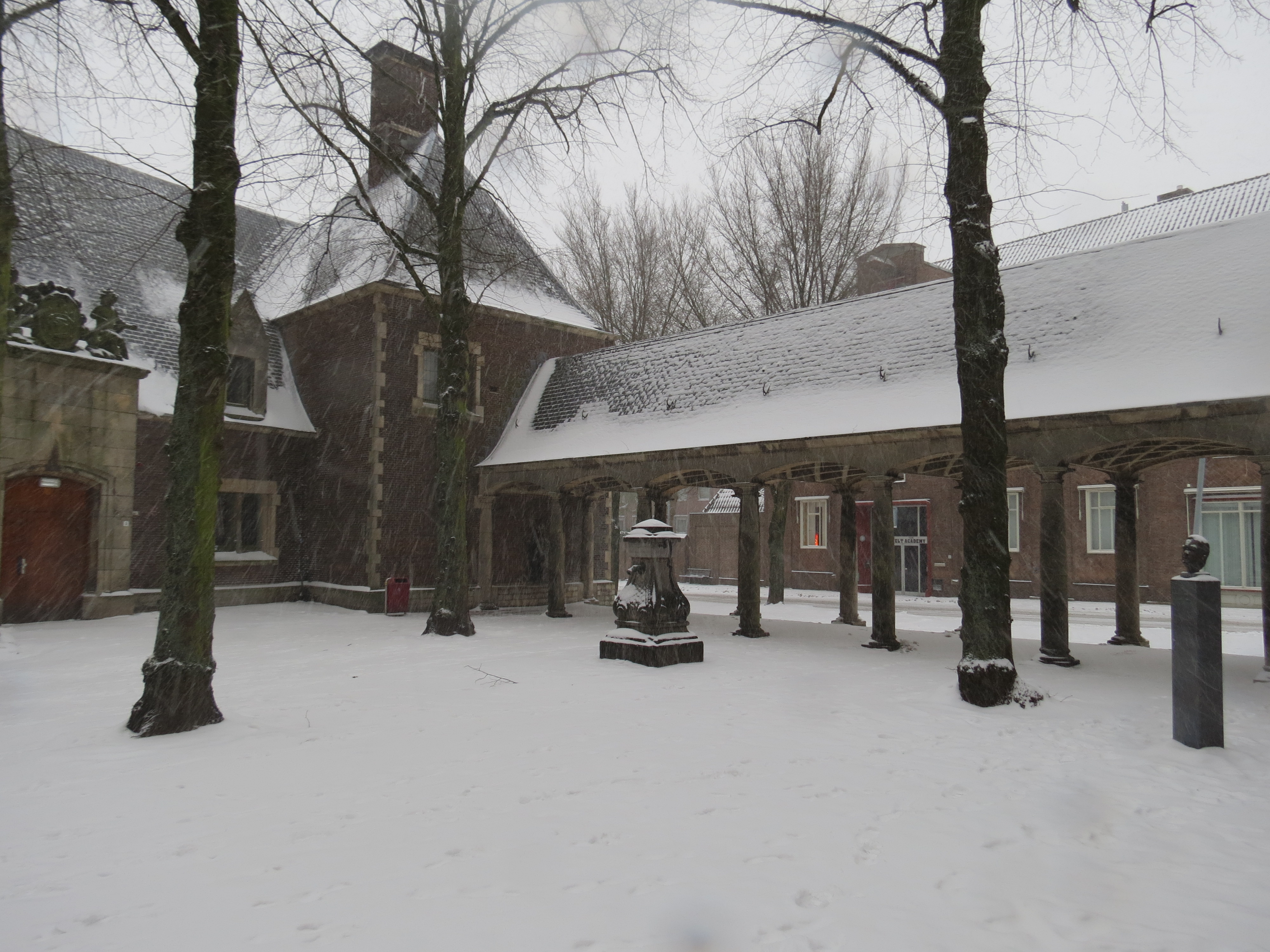
The Helm Square

Next to these, Elliott, located in the former post office of Middelburg, is a building that contains classrooms, a study area, a bar with a lounge area and a basement bar for parties. Elliott is completely managed by students, organized in the Common House Elliott Foundation.

An outdoor classroom, known as Metamorfose Lokaal, is located on the Helm. A joint initiative of UCR and the municipality of Middelburg, it opened in 2017 in occasion of the 400th anniversary of the birth in Middelburg of Jan Goedart, a prominent Dutch entomologist and painter. UCR classes regularly take place outdoor in this classroom, as well as other lectures open to the public.

=== Housing locations ===
UCR is a residential college, meaning that all admitted students are guaranteed affordable housing for the duration of their studies. Students live in one of the residential halls, Bagijnhof, Roggeveenhof, Koestraat or Bachtensteene, all within Middelburg. These halls house between 100 and 200 students each, and are spread throughout the city.

=== Library ===
Students have full access to the Zeeland Library, the largest library in the province, and can use the digital library of Utrecht University.

== Student life ==
=== Student organisations ===
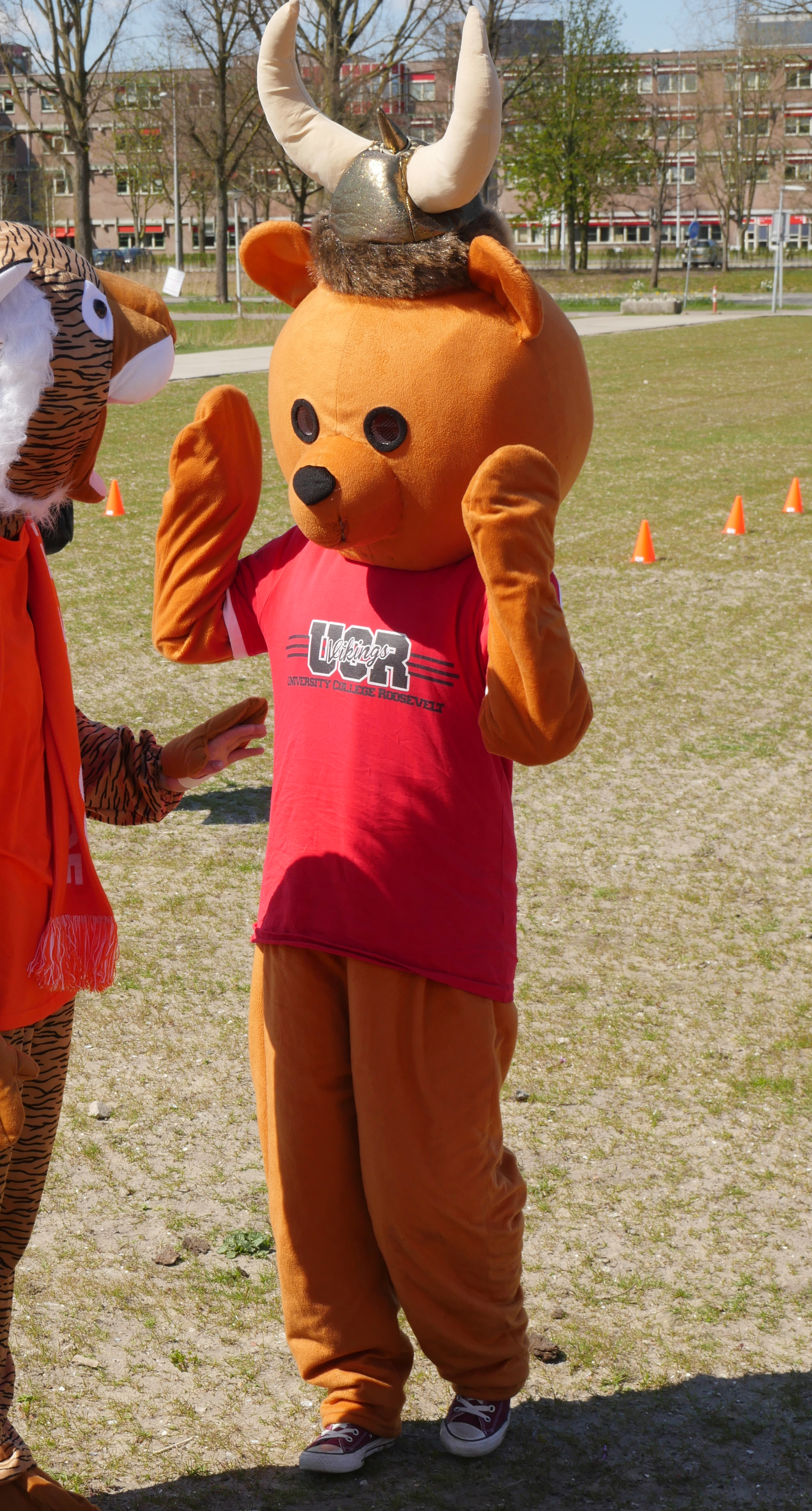
UCR's mascot Teddy

The Roosevelt's All Students Association (RASA) is a student association open to all students at UCR. RASA is the umbrella organization of many different student-led societies and teams. The RASA board consists of six members that are elected yearly by the student body.

The Academic Affairs Council (AAC) is mainly responsible for handling academic complaints, monitoring academic standards, representing students as a part of UCR, and helping students academically. It is active in some of the university's major decision-making bodies, to ensure student input on different levels. The AAC is also responsible for representing UCR on a national level, at the UCSRN (University College Student Representatives the Netherlands) and ISO (Interstedelijk Studenten Overleg). This board consists of a chair, vice-chair, student advisor, internal officer and external officer.

The Housing Affairs Council (HAC) has multiple functions: HAC represents students’ housing interests and works to ensure good living conditions on campus for a reasonable price. The board consist of a chair, a secretary, a treasurer and four campus elders.

=== Social ===
A sorority and a fraternity are present at UCR, providing members with weekly activities and organizing larger events for the wider UCR population. A.L. Fides (sorority) and O.M.D. Erodios (fraternity) are currently active organizations. Their activities include weekly Tuesday borrels, trips, room crawls, organized dinners, joint borrels, and end-of-year barbecues. A.L. Fides aims to provide a supportive social and academic network for its members and to enhance student life. Both organizations are active and continue to accept new members.

V.S.V Illicio, a former sorority, is no longer active as of early 2025 due to a lack of membership and limited interest from prospective members.

Additionally there is a student rowing association, M.S.R.A. Odin (Middelburg Student Rowing Association Odin), open to all UCR students who host weekly dinners and other social events for its members, and make up more than 10% of the student body.

=== Athletics ===
The RASA Sports Committee, called SportsCo, organizes a variety of sports for students. Regular trainings and events are hosted in various sports centres in Middelburg. Inter-collegiate tournaments with other University Colleges in the Netherlands are regularly held.

M.S.R.A. Odin, the Middelburg Student Rowing Association, is an independent rowing association associated with UCR and open to Hogeschool Zeeland students.

Roosevelt runners (RR) is UCR's student running club. During the year, the Roosevelt Runners participate in international competitions such as the Batavierenrace, national races like CPC Loop Den Haag and provincial races all around Zeeland. They also take part in local charity fun runs.

=== Choir ===
The Roosevelt College Choir is UCR's official choir, consisting of about 20 students. All members are in the choir at least one academic year, during which they follow the Choir Course. The Choir Course was required for those students who were following the music performing programme, which is no longer available. The ensemble enhances academic events and performs during church services and independent concerts throughout the year.

=== Traditions ===
During official academic ceremonies, a procession of notables and professors in academic dress walks from the City Hall to Middelburg's New Church (Dutch: Nieuwe Kerk), part of the Middelburg Abbey complex, where the ceremonies are held. The Convocation takes place in the New Church at the start of every academic year, while the Graduation ceremony, when the weather permits, is held in the adjacent Abbey Square. The celebration of the founding of the college, known as Dies Natalis, takes place every five years.

At the beginning of every semester, an Introweek is organised to welcome new students.

A yearly dragon boat race known as King of the Channel sees UCR students in competition with students from HZ University of Applied Sciences and other higher education institutions in the region. The race takes place on the Canal through Walcheren, the stretch of water between Middelburg and Vlissingen, where the HZ is located.

== Alumni organisation and Friends of UCR ==
Aurora Alumni Foundation is UCR's alumni association. Together with UCR and the 'Friends of UCR', they form the Roosevelt Alumni Board, which ensures that alumni relations are maintained by providing opportunities for social interaction, networking and various services. As of August 2022 there are over 2200 alumni.

Friends of UCR is an independent foundation associated with University College Roosevelt. It is governed by a board consisting of UCR representatives, major sponsors from the foundation, and UCR alumni and provides interest-free loans to international students to study at the college, with extended grace periods. This gives students sufficient time to pursue further education and establish themselves professionally after graduating.

== See also ==
- Utrecht University
- University College Utrecht
- University Colleges in the Netherlands
