= HZ University of Applied Sciences =

University in Zeeland, Netherlands

- Type: Public University of Applied Sciences
- Established: 1987
- Students: 4,500
- Location: Vlissingen, Netherlands
- Website: http://hz.nl/en

The HZ University of Applied Sciences (Short: HZ) is a Dutch university of applied sciences with campuses in Zeeland.

HZ University of Applied Sciences has three locations:

- Edisonweg in Vlissingen
- The HZ Tower in Vlissingen
- Groene Woud in Middelburg
