= Utrecht University =

Public research university in the Netherlands

- Universiteit Utrecht
- Latin: Universitas Rheno-Traiectina; Universitas Ultraiectina
- Motto: Sol Iustitiae Illustra Nos (Latin)
- Motto in English: May the Sun of Righteousness Enlighten Us
- Type: Public, research
- Established: 26 March 1636 (390 years ago)
- Academic affiliations: CG, LERU, EUA, IAU, TPC, MISA, Utrecht Network
- Endowment: € 731 million (2025)
- Budget: € 3 billion (2025): University: € 1.272 billion (2025); Hospital: € 1.759 billion (2025)
- President: Hans Brug
- Rector: Wilco Hazeleger
- Academic staff: 4,474
- Administrative staff: 4,372
- Total staff: 8,846
- Students: 38,493
- Location: Utrecht, Utrecht Province, Netherlands; 52°05′07″N 05°10′30″E
- Campus: Urban
- Colours: Yellow, red, black & white
- Website: uu.nl

Utrecht University (UU; Dutch: Universiteit Utrecht, formerly Rijksuniversiteit Utrecht) is a public research university in Utrecht, Netherlands. Established 26 March 1636 (390 years ago), it is one of the oldest universities in the Netherlands. In 2025, it had an enrollment of 38,493 students, and employed 8,846 faculty members and staff. More than 600 PhD degrees were awarded and 9,071 scientific articles were published. The university's 2025 budget was €3 billion, consisting of €1.272 billion for the university (income from work commissioned by third parties is 368 million euros) and €1.759 billion for the University Medical Center Utrecht.

The university's interdisciplinary research targets life sciences, pathways to sustainability, dynamics of youth, and institutions for open societies. Utrecht University is led by the University Board, consisting of Wilco Hazeleger (Rector Magnificus), Anton Pijpers (President), Agnes Muskens (interim Vice President) and Casper Meijers (Student Assessor). Close ties are harboured with other institutions internationally through its membership in the Coimbra Group (CG), the League of European Research Universities (LERU), the Utrecht Network and the European University Association (EUA).

== History ==
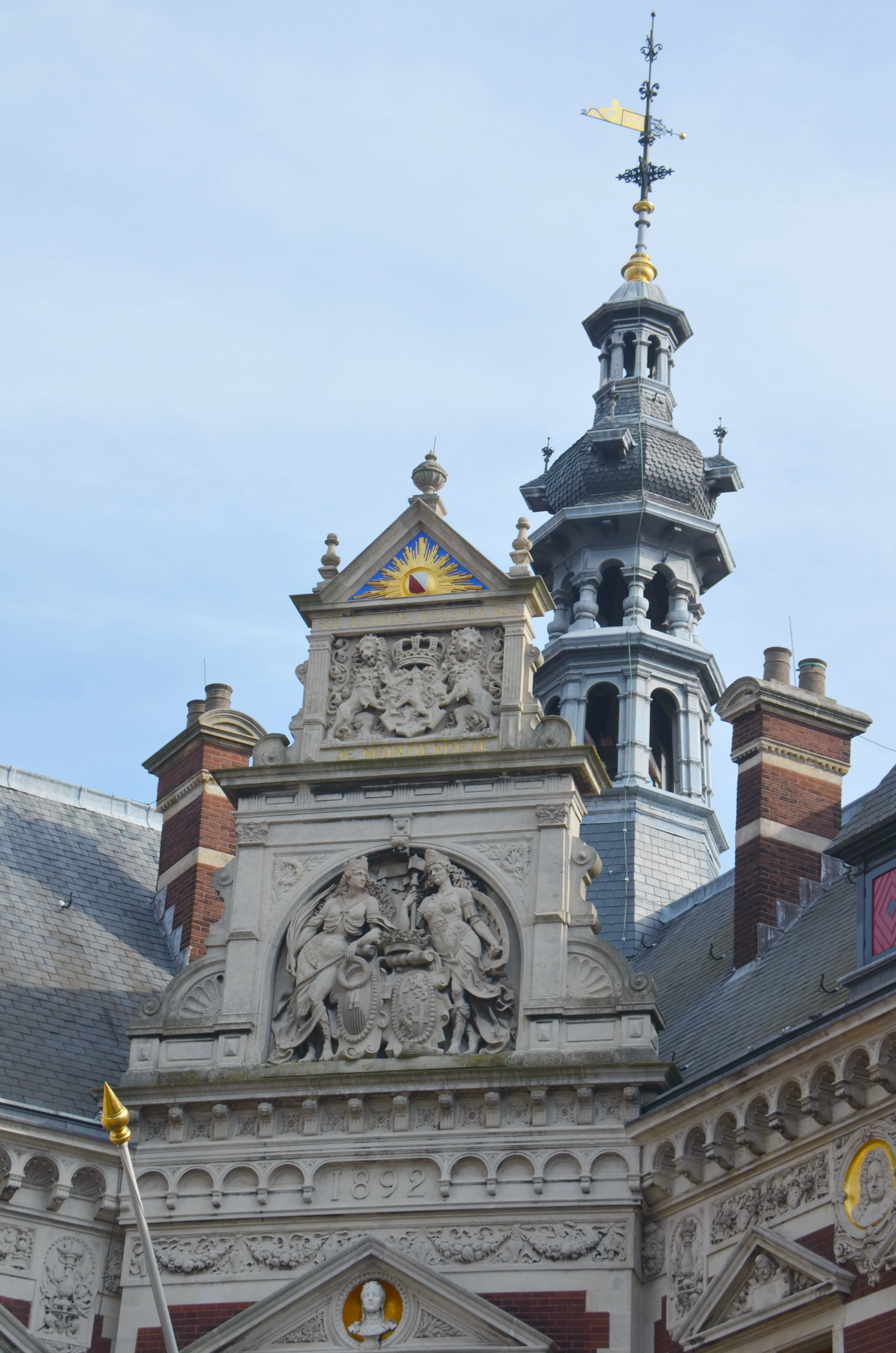
Gable decoration at the University Hall building (Academiegebouw).

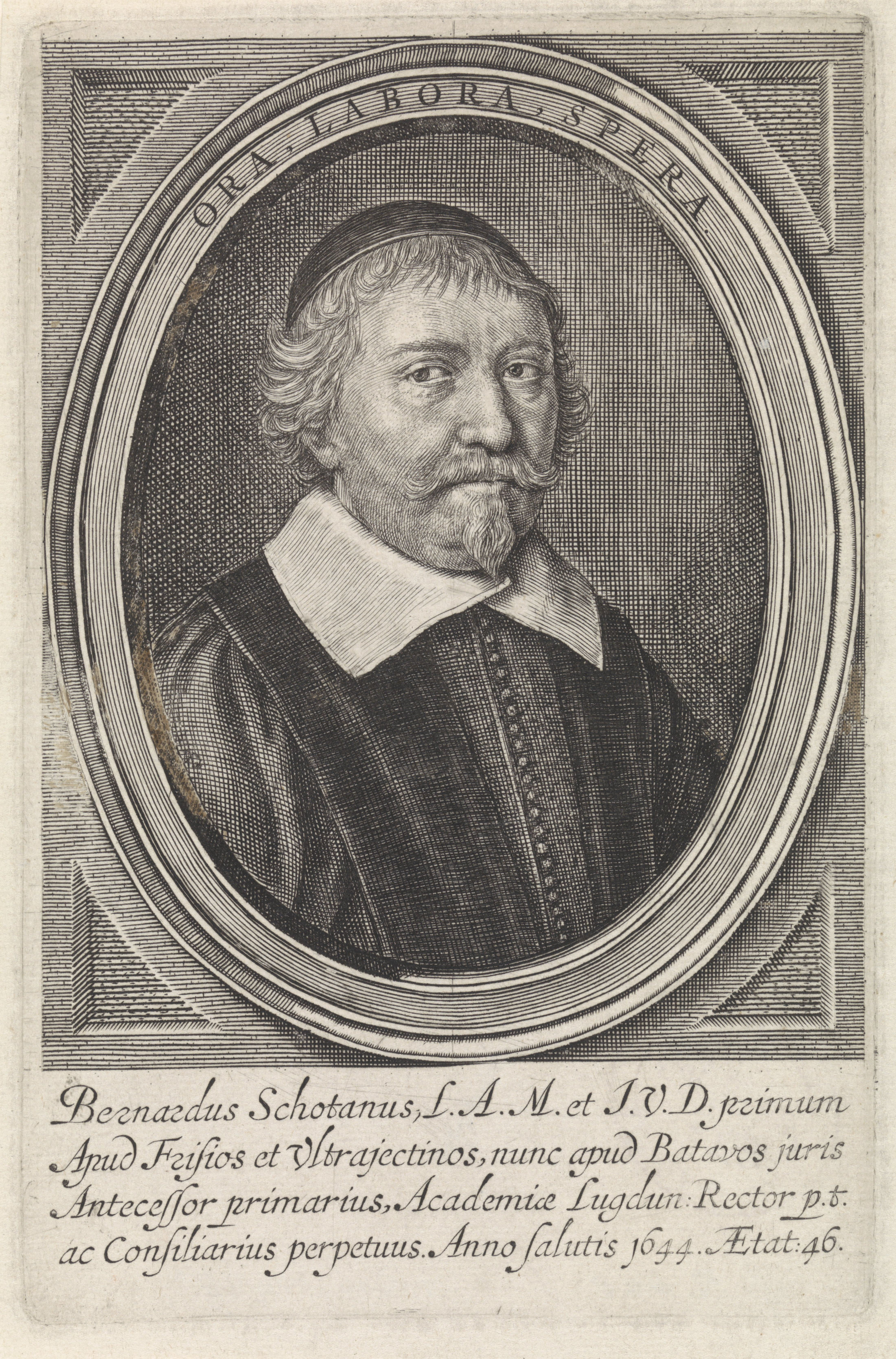
Bernardus Schotanus, the university's first rector magnificus, and professor of law and mathematics

Utrecht University was founded on 26 March 1636. It has its roots in the Illustrious School of Utrecht, founded two years earlier in 1634, which was elevated to the status of university in 1636. The influential professor of theology Gisbertus Voetius delivered the inaugural speech, and Bernardus Schotanus (professor of law and mathematics) became the university's first rector magnificus. Anna Maria van Schurman, who became the university's first female student, was invited to write a Latin poem for the inauguration. Initially, only a few dozen students attended classes at the university. Seven professors worked in four faculties: philosophy, which offered all students an introductory education, and three higher-level faculties (theology, medicine and law).

Utrecht University flourished in the seventeenth century, and contributed significantly to the Dutch Golden Age, despite competition with the older universities, such as Leiden (1575) and Groningen (1614). Leiden, in particular, proved a strong competitor and made further improvement necessary; a rivalry that persists to this day. A botanical garden was built on the grounds of the present Sonnenborgh Observatory, and three years later the Smeetoren added an astronomical observatory. The university attracted many students from abroad (especially from Germany, England and Scotland). They witnessed the intellectual and theological battle fought between proponents of the new philosophy (René Descartes lived for a few years in Utrecht) and proponents of the strict Reformed theologian Voetius. They also witnessed the teachings of renowned Dutch jurist, Johannes Voet, a university alumnus and professor of law, whose works remain highly authoritative in modern Roman-Dutch law.

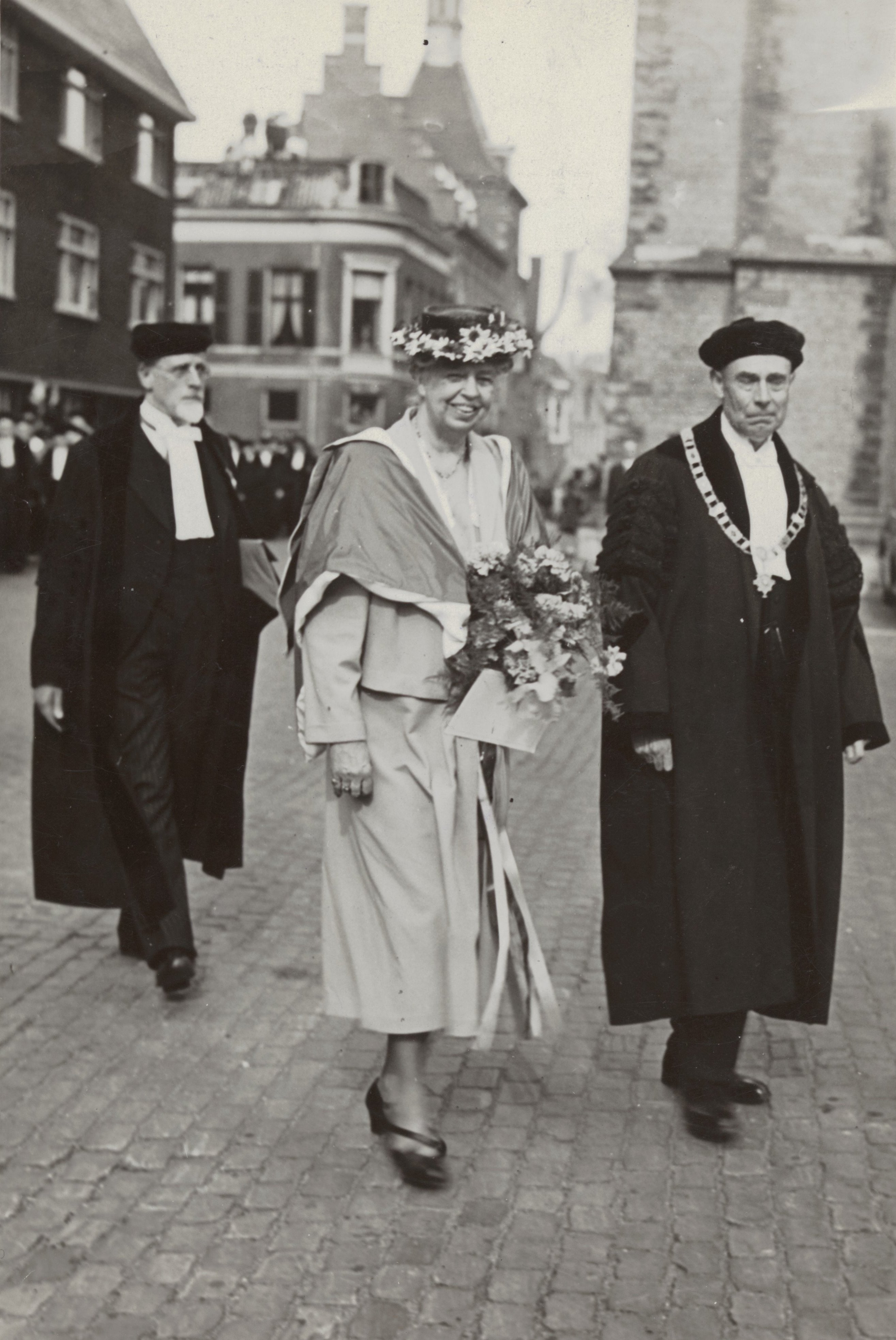
An honorary doctorate in law was conferred on Eleanor Roosevelt in 1948.

In 1806, the French occupying authorities of the Netherlands downgraded Utrecht University to an école secondaire (high school), but after the establishment of the United Kingdom of the Netherlands in 1813 it regained its former status. Leiden, Leuven, Groningen, Utrecht and Ghent were the five universities (Dutch: hoge scholen) of the new state. Two of the universities (Leuven and Ghent) became part of the new Belgian state after their respective provinces separated from the United Kingdom of the Netherlands in 1830. As a result, Utrecht University remained one of only three Dutch universities. During the French occupation, King Louis Napoleon ordered the construction of a palace in the centre of Utrecht, which eventually became the University Library City Centre.

Utrecht University played a prominent role in the golden age of Dutch science. Around 1850 the "Utrechtian School" of science formed, with Pieter Harting, Gerardus J. Mulder, Christophorus H. D. Buys Ballot and Franciscus Donders among the leading scientists. They introduced the educational laboratory (onderwijslaboratorium) as a practical learning place for their students. The National Veterinary School (Dutch: Rijks Veeartsenijschool) became Utrecht University's Faculty of Veterinary Medicine in 1918.

As the university grew, the academic buildings in the historic city centre were unable to meet the university's increasing need for space. Therefore, starting from the 1960s, a significant part of the university moved to the Utrecht Science Park campus, which occupies the easternmost part of the city and is located south of De Bilt. However, the university continued to retain its academic buildings and presence in the historic city centre.

The university is represented in the Stichting Academisch Erfgoed, a foundation with the goal of preserving the university's heritage and collections.

== Organisation ==
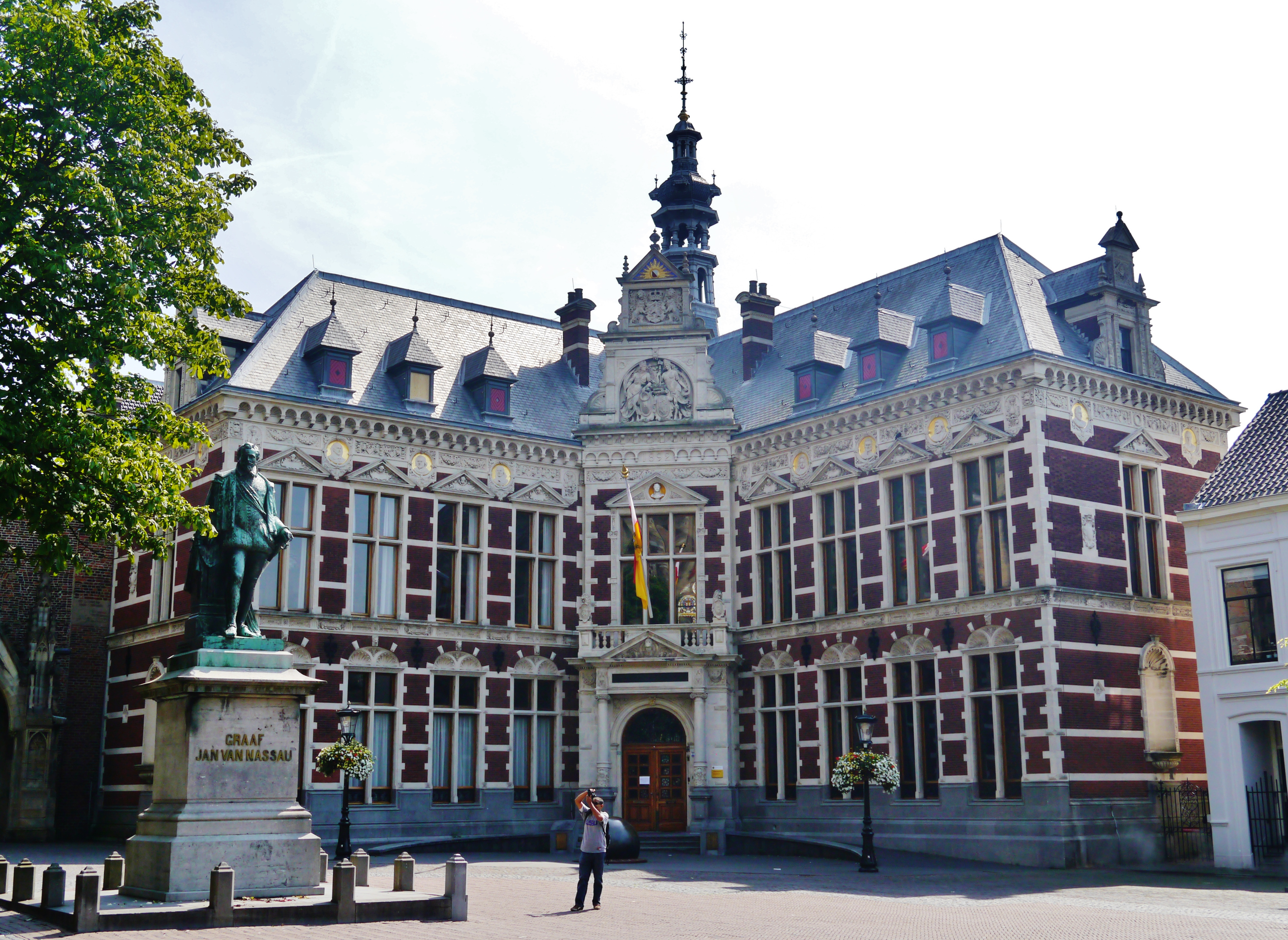
Utrecht University Hall (Academiegebouw), built in 1894

The university consists of seven faculties, 772 research units, 16 artificial intelligence laboratories which offer 58 undergraduate degree programmes and over 148 graduate programmes. At the end of 2024, Utrecht University had a portfolio of research projects worth 1.73 billion euros, which is 107 million more than at the end of 2023. Most of the grants came from research financier NWO and the European Union, which account for approximately 1 billion euros when combined. Technology Transfer Office and startup incubator UtrechtInc facilitates the commercialization of research through patent licensing, spin-offs, and industry partnerships. Utrecht University had 413 patents between 2000 and 2020.

Faculty	School/Department
Faculty of Geosciences	Department of Earth Sciences; Department of Physical Geography; Department of Sustainable Development (Copernicus Institute); Department of Human Geography and Spatial Planning
Faculty of Humanities	Department of History and Art History; Department of Languages, Literature and Communication; Department of Media and Culture Studies; Department of Philosophy and Religious Studies
Faculty of Law, Economics and Governance	Utrecht University School of Law; Utrecht University School of Economics (USE); Utrecht University School of Governance (USG)
Faculty of Medical Sciences
Faculty of Science	Department of Biology; Department of Chemistry; Department of Information and Computing Sciences; Department of Mathematics; Department of Pharmaceutical Sciences; Department of Physics
Faculty of Social and Behavioural Sciences	Department of Education and Pedagogy; Department of Social Sciences; Department of Psychology
Faculty of Veterinary Medicine

There are also three interfaculty units:

- University College Utrecht
- University College Roosevelt
- Centre for Education and Learning (COLUU)

The University Corporate Offices includes several operational departments and the Centre for Science and Culture (CWC), which runs the university's public engagement activities (including the public lecture series Studium Generale), the University Museum Utrecht and Parnassos Cultural Centre.

== Campus ==
The two large faculties of Humanities and Law, Economics & Governance are situated in the city centre of Utrecht. The other five faculties and most of the administrative services are located at Utrecht Science Park, a campus area on the outskirts of the city. University College Utrecht, along with the Utrecht School of Economics, are situated in the former Kromhout Kazerne, which used to be a Dutch military base. University College Roosevelt is located off-campus in the city of Middelburg in the south-west of the Netherlands.

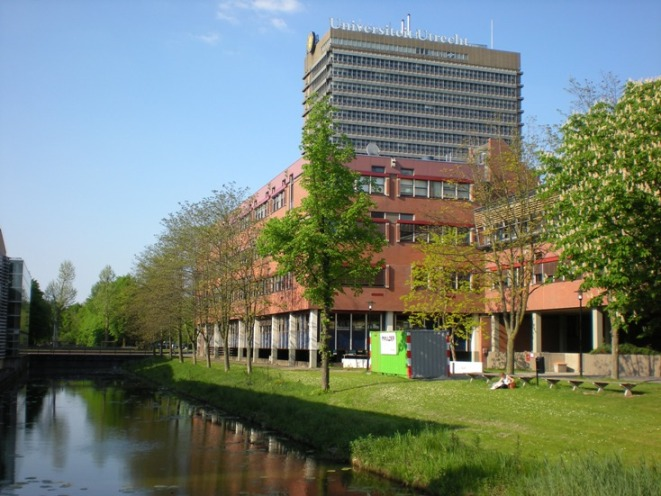
Utrecht Science Park

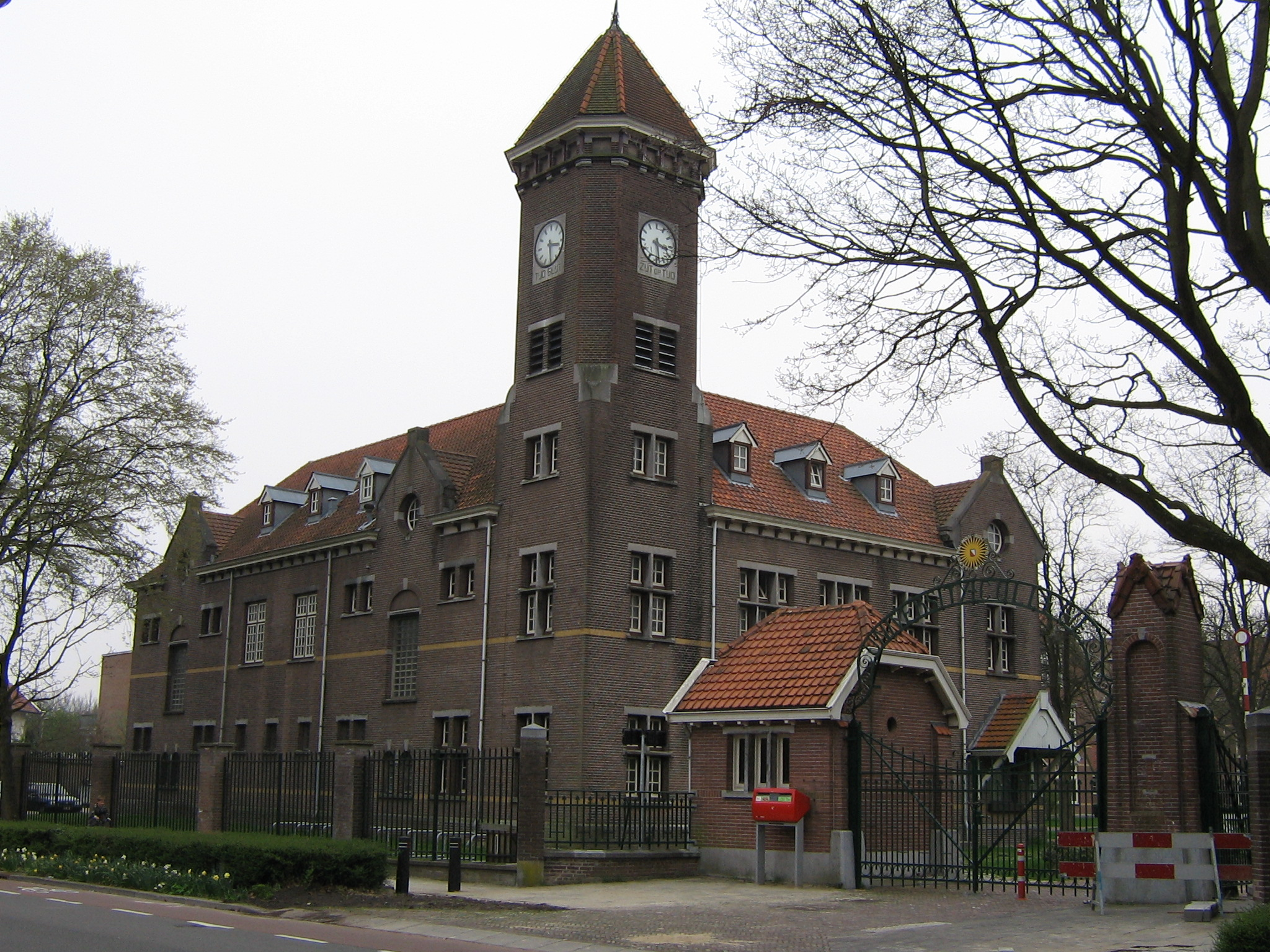
University College

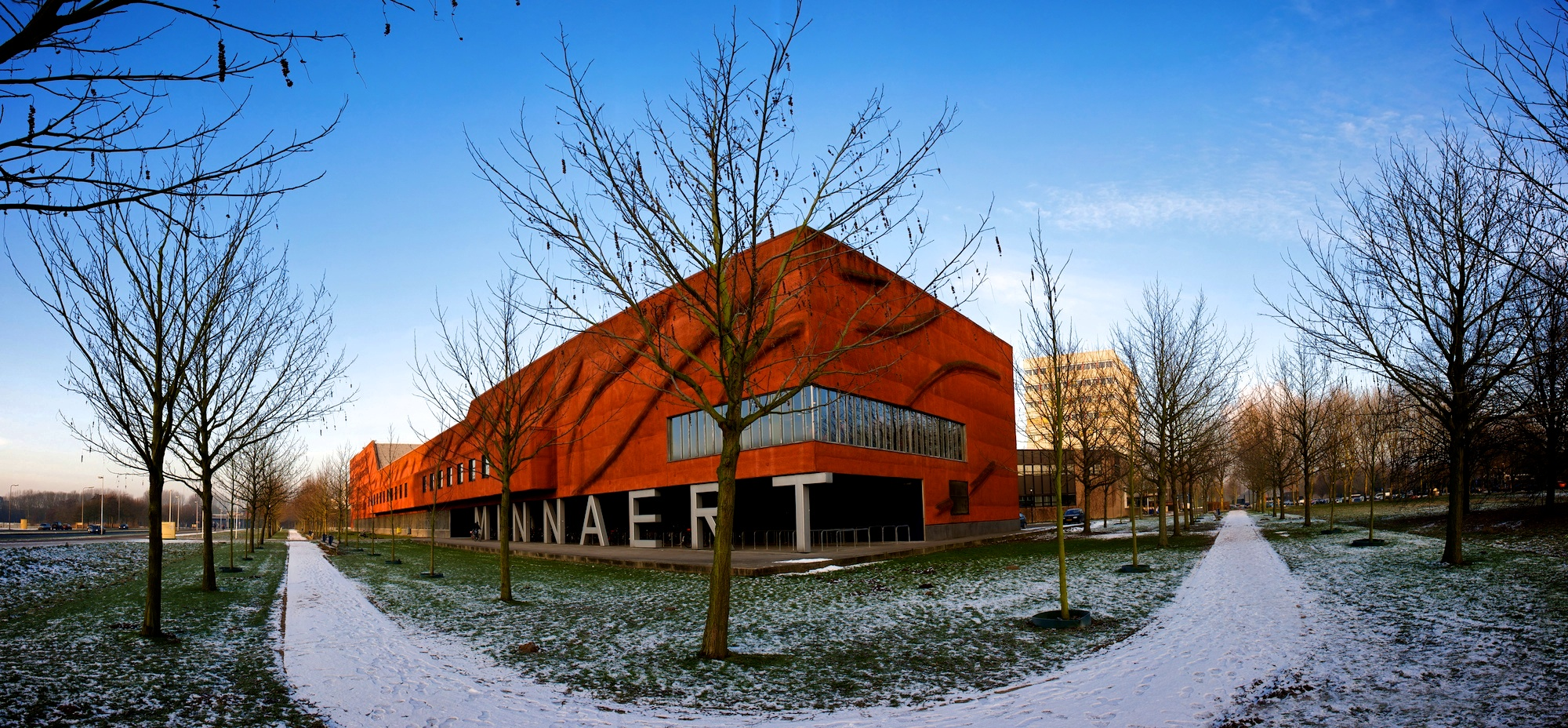
Minnaert Building

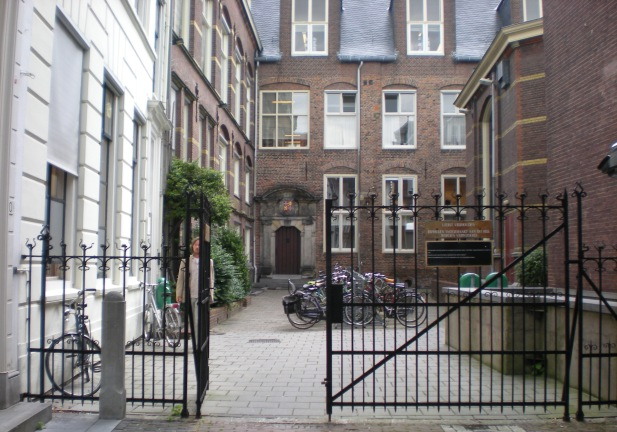
Juridische Bibliotheek (former law library)

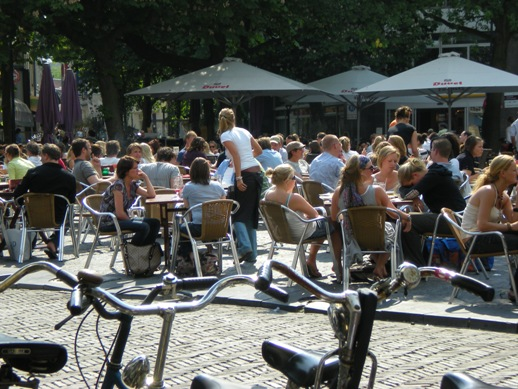
Student life, Neude square, Utrecht city centre

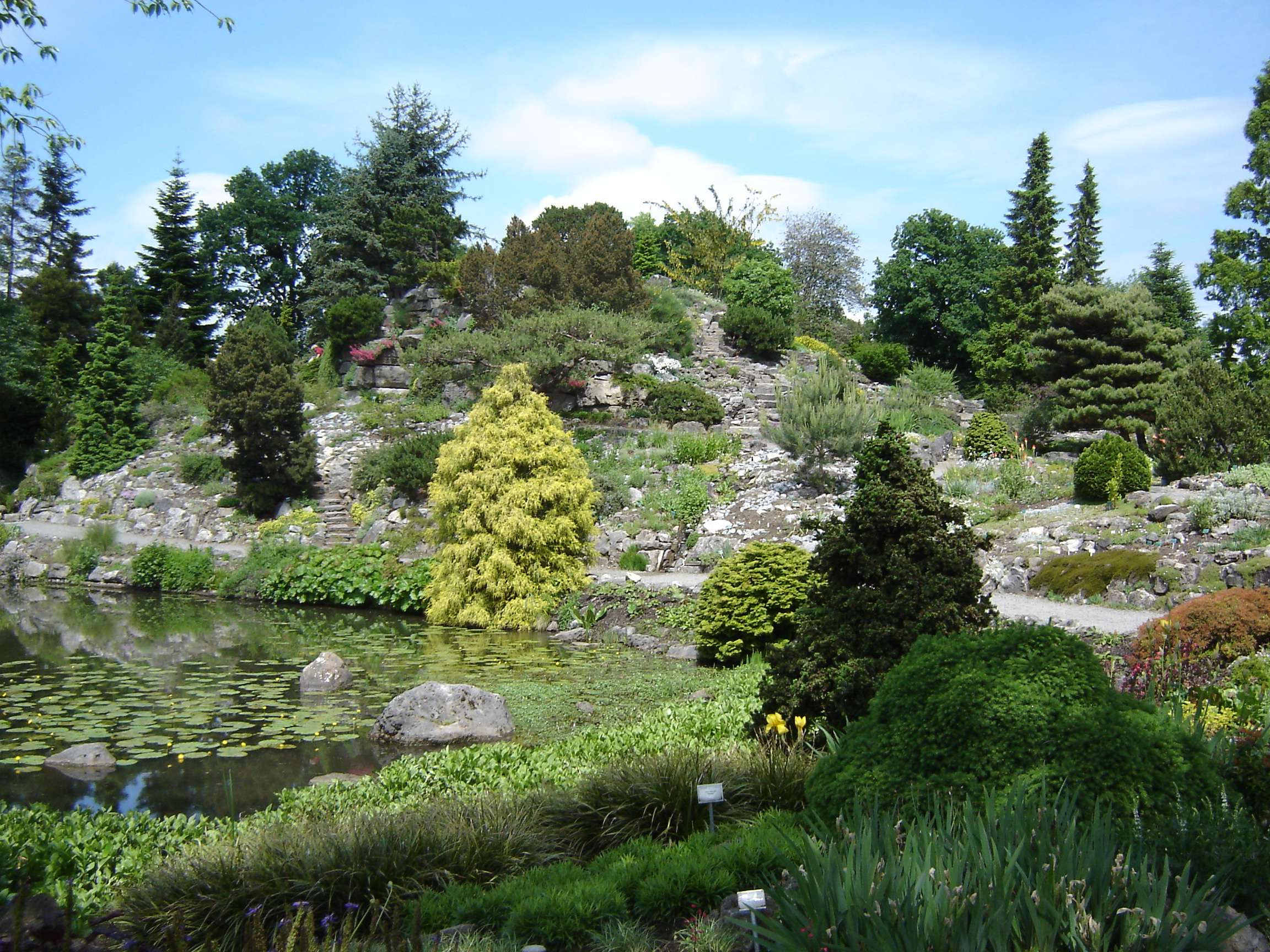
Utrecht University Botanic Gardens

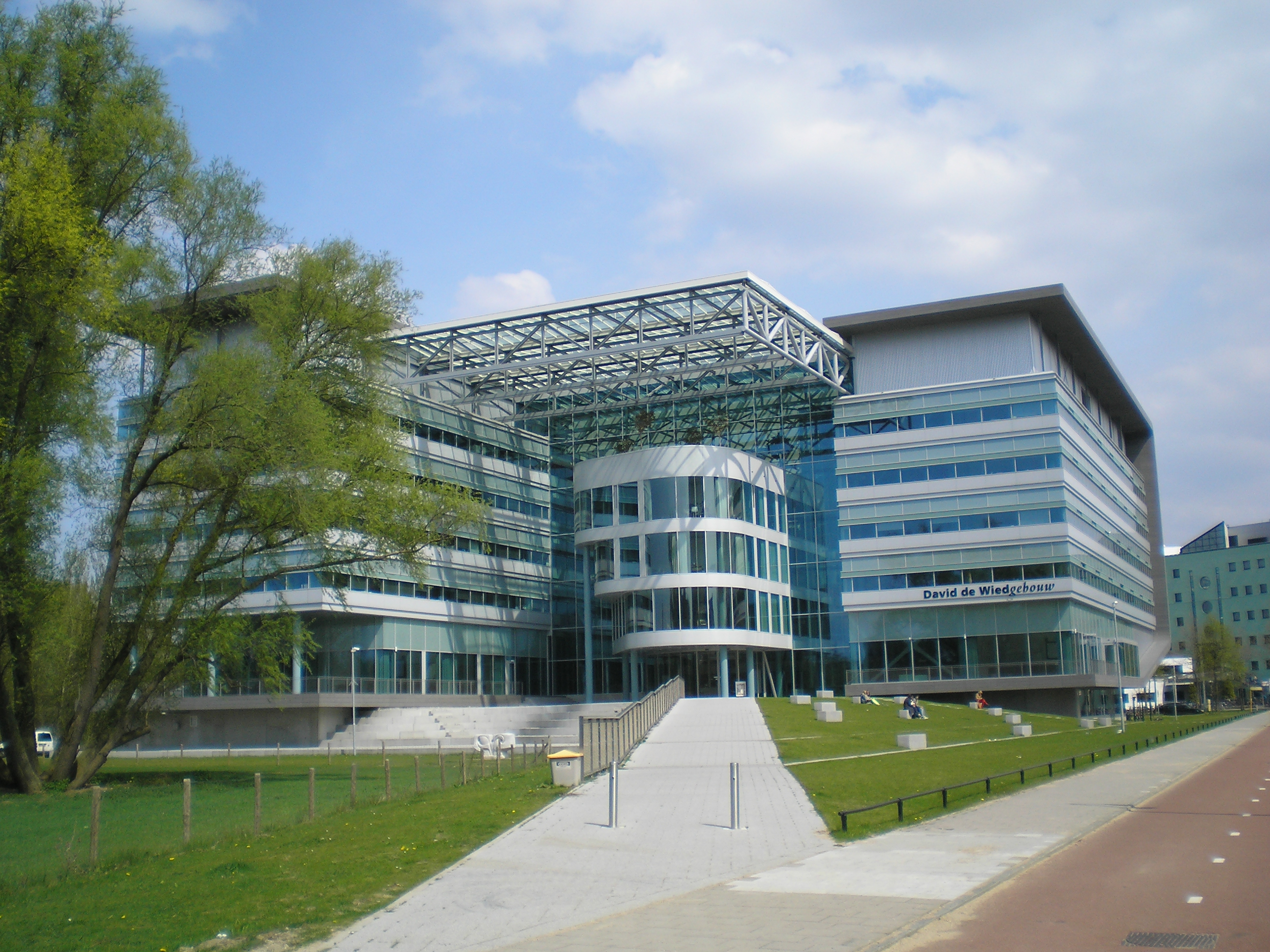
David de Wied building

== International rankings ==
University rankings

Global – Overall
- ARWU World: 60 (2026)
- CWUR World: 80 (2026)
- CWTS World: 66 (2025)
- QS World: =113 (2027)
- THE World: 66 (2023)
- USNWR Global: 54 (2026–27)

University rankings

National – Overall
- ARWU National: 1 (2026)
- CWTS National: 4 (2025)
- CWUR National: 1 (2026)
- QS National: =3 (2027)
- THE National: 3 (2023)
- USNWR National: =2 (2026–27)

In the 2025 Academic Ranking of World Universities (ARWU), the University of Utrecht was ranked 56th globally, the highest in the Netherlands but down from 40th in 2003. Top subjects include public administration (2nd) and earth sciences (8th). Other notable rankings are in water resources (11th), and pharmacy (12th), oceanography (17th), psychology (20th), veterinary sciences (24th), law (25th), geography (31st), atmospheric science: (38th), education (38th), environmental science and engineering: (42nd), biological sciences (44th), clinical medicine (51–75), ecology (51–75), public health (51–75), medical technology (51–75), nursing (76–100), biotechnology (76–100), physics (76–100), artificial intelligence (76–100), economics (76–100).

In the 2024 U.S. News & World Report Best Global Universities Ranking, Utrecht University was ranked 46th in the world. Its top-performing subjects included microbiology (6th), geosciences (14th), meteorology and atmospheric sciences (15th), surgery (18th), infectious diseases (21st), public health (21st), education and educational research (22nd), psychiatry/psychology (22nd), pharmacology and toxicology (25th), plant and animal science (28th), radiology, nuclear medicine, and medical imaging (31st), cardiac and cardiovascular systems (42nd), water resources (45th), marine biology (46th), environment/ecology (46th), cell biology (48th), immunology (53rd), and biology and biochemistry (60th).

In the 2023 Times Higher Education World University Rankings, the university was ranked 66th. Best-ranked subjects were education (24th), psychology (26th), medicine and dentistry (67th), biological sciences (63rd), veterinary sciences (63rd), physical sciences (59th), and law (36th).

- THE Reputation (2025): 67th worldwide
- THE Employability (2026) 100th worldwide

In the 2026 QS World University Rankings by subject, the rankings are as follows: veterinary science (9th), geophysics (13th), geology (14th), earth & marine sciences (16th), public administration (16th), geography (17th), environmental sciences (22nd), psychology (28th), education (32nd), development studies (36th), pharmacy & pharmacology (37th), life sciences and medicine (45th), biological sciences (62nd), medicine (67th), law (75th), natural sciences (85th).

In 2025, the analytics company Clarivate ranked Utrecht University 43rd in the world and 8th in Europe, with 28 highly cited researchers in the top 1% by citations for their field(s) and publication year in the Web of Science over the past decade.

Utrecht University was also mentioned in the BlueSky Ranking Of University Rankings 2025/26 published by Matt Symonds, co-founder of QS. BlueSky Ranking Of University Rankings considers the aggregation of the performance of schools across four major rankings: AWRU, QS, THE, and USNWR. In this ranking, Utrecht University was placed 58th worldwide, 19th in Europe, and 2nd in the Netherlands.

== Affiliations ==
Utrecht University is a member of:

- The Coimbra Group
- The League of European Research Universities
- The Utrecht Network
- The European University Association
- The International Association of Universities
- The McDonnell International Scholars Academy

Utrecht University operates strategic international partnership with KU Leuven, University College London, Chinese University of Hong Kong, University of Toronto, University of Sydney.

== Notable alumni and faculty ==
Utrecht University counts a number of distinguished scholars among its alumni and faculty, including 12 Nobel Prize, 1 Pulitzer Prize, 2 Wolf Prize, 2 National Medal of Science, 22 Spinoza Prize and 4 Stevin Prize laureates. The university counts several heads of state and government amongst its graduates, including: 4 members of Dutch royal house, 6 Prime Ministers of the Netherlands, 6 foreign heads of state or government, and 35 Ministers of the Cabinet of the Netherlands.

Utrecht University alumni have won a total of 13 gold Olympic medals.

== See also ==
- List of early modern universities in Europe
- Roosevelt Academy International Honors College of Utrecht University located in Middelburg, Zeeland
- University College Utrecht International Honors College of Utrecht University located in Utrecht
- Utrecht Network
- Utrecht School of the Arts
- Utrecht Summer School
- Utrecht University of Applied Sciences (HU – Hogeschool Utrecht)
- Codex Boreelianus
- Open Access Scholarly Publishers Association, of which Utrecht University Library is a founding member
- Bijvoet Centre for Biomolecular Research, a research institute of Utrecht University in the field of molecular Life Sciences
