= University College Utrecht =

College of Utrecht University

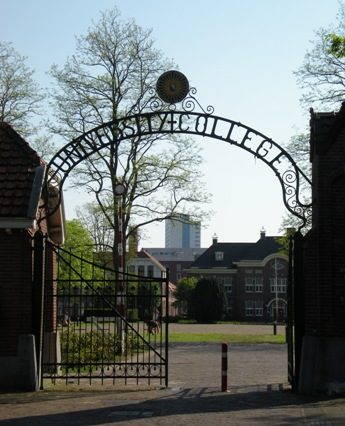
- Entry gate to UCU campus
- Motto: Sol Iustitiae Illustra Nos
- Motto in English: Sun of Righteousness, shine upon us
- Type: Public, Liberal arts college
- Established: 1998
- Affiliations: Utrecht University
- Dean: Prof. dr. Manon Kluijtmans
- Academic staff: 160
- Students: 750
- Undergraduates: 750
- Postgraduates: 0
- Location: Campusplein 1, 3584ED, Utrecht, Utrecht, Netherlands; 52.0833°N 5.1478°E
- Campus: Urban

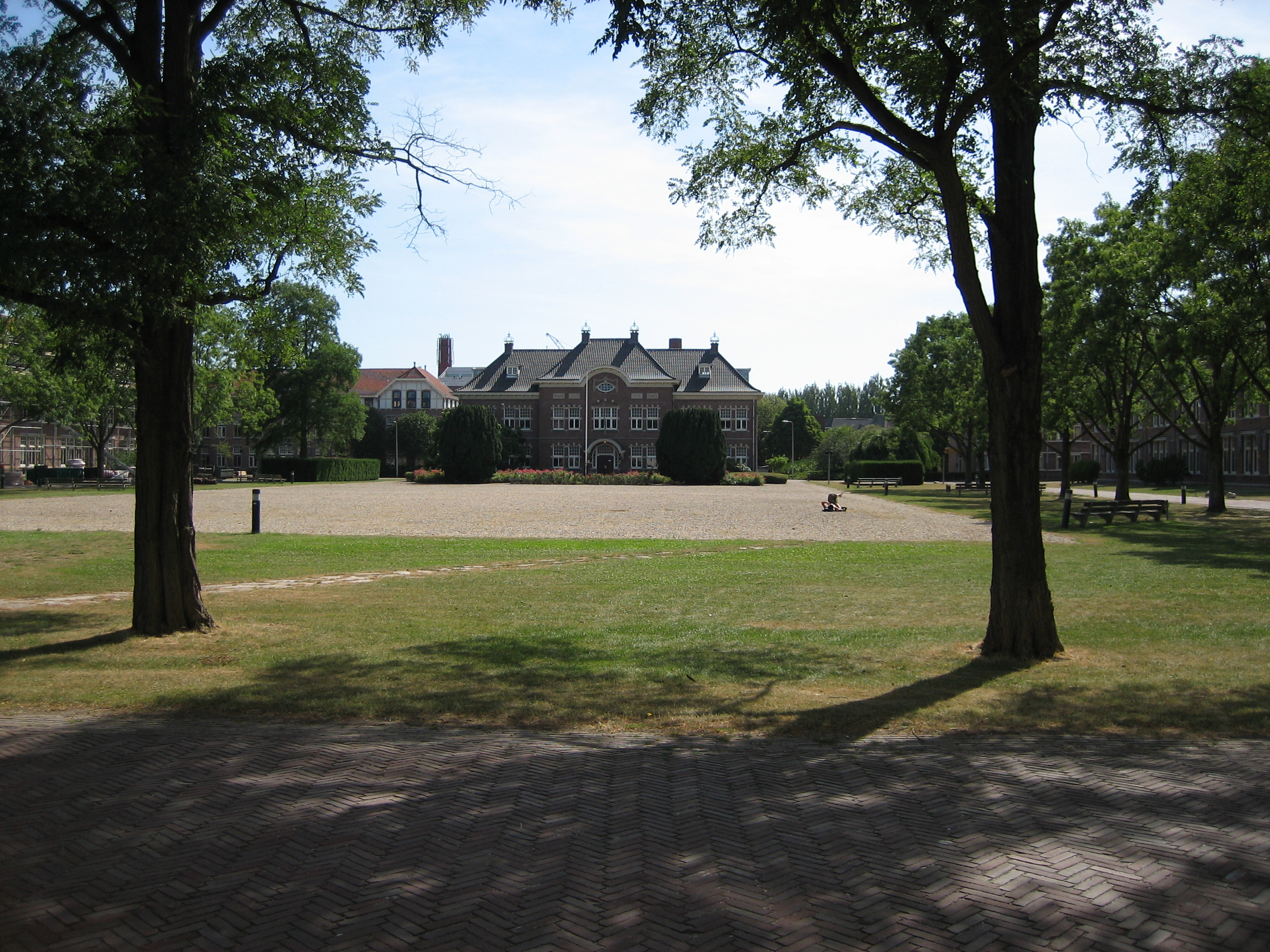
University College Utrecht campus, 2006

University College Utrecht (UCU) provides English-language Liberal Arts and Sciences undergraduate education. Founded in 1998, as the first university college in the Netherlands, it is part of Utrecht University. Around 750 students of 70 different nationalities live and study on campus. Students can design their individual curriculum with courses from more than 20 disciplines in three domains: Science, Social Sciences and Humanities.

All students follow a three-year bachelor programme. They graduate with a degree from Utrecht University, either a Bachelor of Science or a Bachelor of Arts.

== Campus ==
The campus is located at the former Kromhout Kazerne.

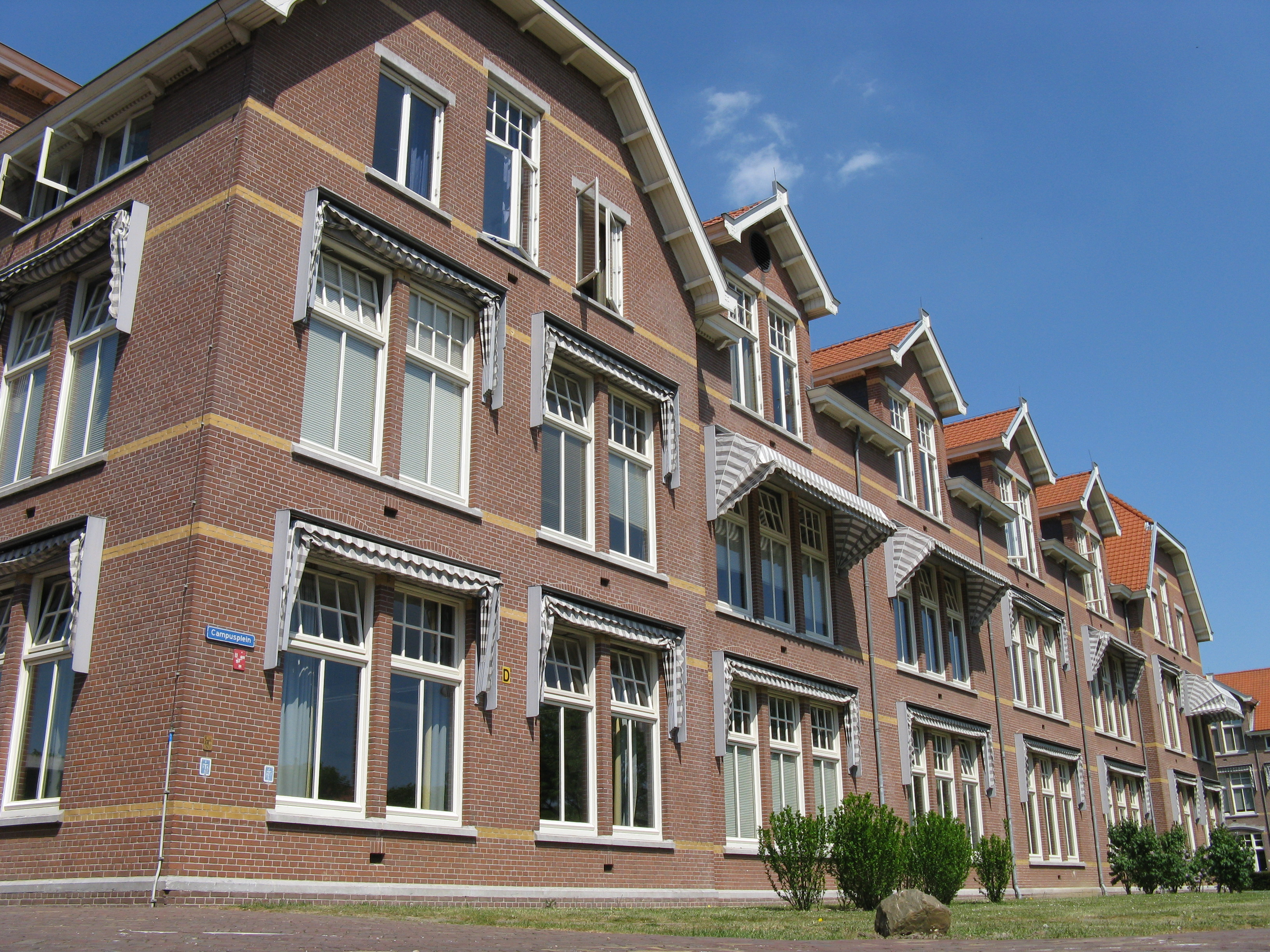
The Voltaire Building, 2008

The classes are in three academic buildings. These stand around the central quad on both sides of the College Hall. These buildings are named Voltaire, Locke and Newton.

The Dining Hall building served as a military mess on the Kromhout Kazerne. The building now hosts the University College Student Association Bar, a cafetaria and café, a student gym, the University College Student Association Office, UC Student Council Office, and the Campus Affairs Representatives Office..

The Auditorium building used to serve as a military museum, but is now used for larger lectures and performances.

== Admission ==
Students admission policy is based on merit, broad academic interest, and motivation. The application procedure includes submission of a letter of motivation, references, an English proficiency requirement, as well as an interview. University College Utrecht also offers limited scholarships in the form of campus fee waivers to further help students.

=== Ranking ===
The Keuzegids (Dutch study choice guide) assesses about 400 bachelor programs on success rates, quality of education, quality of teaching, facilities and more. University College Utrecht has been awarded the Top Rated Programme quality seal since 2013 annually. The Acceptance rate is about 22%.

=== Accreditation ===
University College Utrecht is accredited by the NVAO, the Accreditation Organization of the Netherlands and Flanders, and has consistently been in the top 5 in Elsevier Magazine’s survey among Dutch institutes of higher education. It is also rated positively by students in the annual National Student Survey (Nationale Studentenenquête or NSE).

=== Academic calendar ===
The academic year begins in the last week of August or first week of September and is divided in two semesters of 15 weeks (including one week Mid-term Break). The standard course load if 4 per semester. There is are optional 5-week Summer Term and a similar Winter Term, during which a student takes one course that can be used to acquire extra credit, to do a special course (such as a Laboratory Course), or to compensate for a failed course.

=== Courses ===
After their first year students elect a major in either Humanities, Social Sciences, Sciences or an interdomain major in a combination of these. In the latter cases a student will have to make a convincing argument to the Director of Education. There are two double degree programmes on offer, combining the University College Utrecht curriculum with a degree in Law, or a degree in Physics.

Students are allowed to combine courses from different disciplines, thereby encouraging multidisciplinary research and interests. In any major a student needs to take 10 courses, of which three at the advanced level and in at least two different fields of study. This will lead to the BA degree (Bachelor of Arts). A BSc degree (Bachelor of Science) requires 12 courses in the Sciences department, the extra two courses being two lab courses to be taken in the Summer or Third term. Furthermore, a student is required to take at least one course in each department, learn one new foreign language, and pass the core course Research in Context, and one course appropriate to the major.

Each course is worth 7.5 ECTS credits. There is continuous assessment based on papers/essays, presentations, class participation and exams. Grades are on the A-F scale (A being equivalent to a GPA of 4.0). First year courses are not factored into the students final grade point average.

=== Exchange programmes ===
Apart from taking courses at other universities in the Netherlands, students have the opportunity to go on exchange to universities worldwide. University College Utrecht also accepts incoming exchange students from partner universities.

== Alumni ==
UCU alumni continue their studies in a wide range of disciplines, and as a result, they find employment with a large number of employers across different fields. Graduates work as doctors, lawyers, psychologists, policy advisors, consultants, politicians, PhD candidates, marketers, and in many other professions. More examples can be found on the UCU website.

== Fees ==
The following figures apply to the academic year 2026-2027: Students from within the European Economic Area pay an annual tuition fee of €5.591, Non-EEA students pay €17.073. Campus fees are €8.231 per year and cover the general costs of living on campus and making use of the campus facilities. Water, electricity and internet connectivity are included. All students pay a contribution of €100 to the UCSA (University College Students Association).
