= Music of Samurai Champloo =

Anime series discography

The music of the 2004 anime series Samurai Champloo, created by the studio Manglobe, was produced by a team of five composers drawn from the hip hop musical scene. They were Shinji "Tsutchie" Tsuchida of Shakkazombie, Fat Jon, Nujabes and Force of Nature. The musical direction was chosen by series creator and director Shinichirō Watanabe as part of his planned blending of hip hop culture with the anime's setting in the Edo period, additionally incorporating contributions from guest artists. The opening theme "Battlecry" was performed and co-written by Shing02, while the various ending themes were performed by Minmi, Kazami, and Azuma Riki. The final episode's ending theme was "San Francisco", licensed from the rapper band Midicronica.

The soundtrack originally released across four CD albums between 2004 and 2005, with vinyl reissues in 2022, by Victor Entertainment. Further albums released in both Japan and North America through other publishers, and remixed tracks have been included in other music releases. A 2006 video game based on the series called Samurai Champloo: Sidetracked was developed by Grasshopper Manufacture, scored by in-house composer Masafumi Takada. Reception of the series' music has been generally positive from Western reviewers of the anime, and remains well-regarded in retrospective articles.

== Concept and inspiration ==
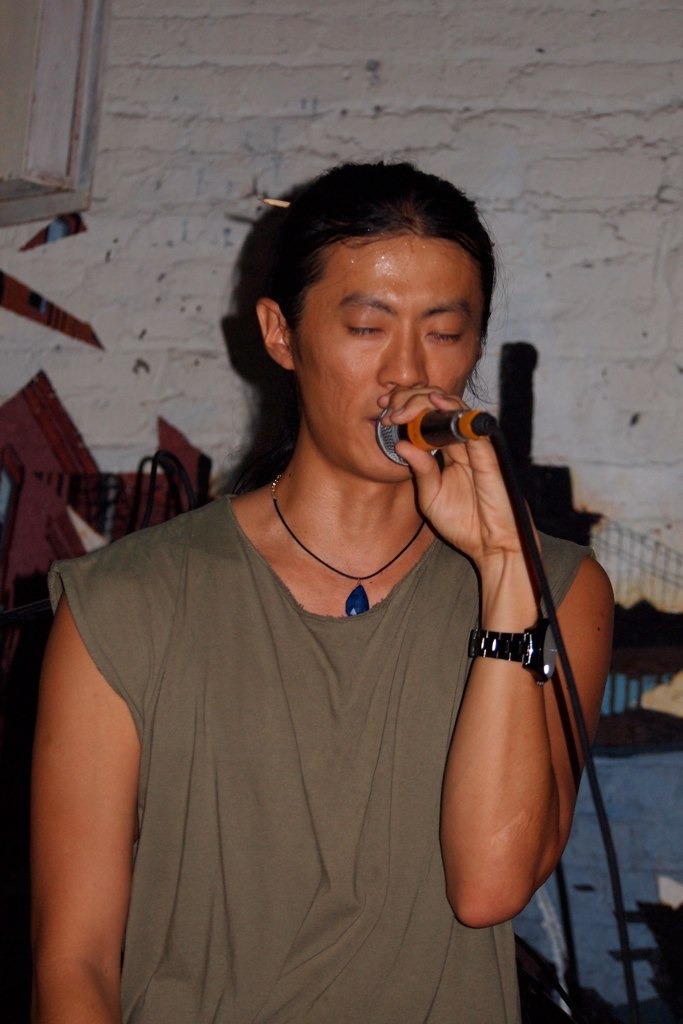
The series music was composed by multiple hip hop musicians, including Nujabes (left). Nujabes created the opening theme, performed by Shing02 (right).

The 2004 anime series Samurai Champloo was created and directed by Shinichirō Watanabe, known at the time for his work on Cowboy Bebop. It was the debut television project of Manglobe, a studio founded in 2002 by former Sunrise staff. Watanabe's goal for the series was to blend a traditional Edo period setting with anachronistic elements including the culture and music of hip hop. When deciding on the music, Shinichirō Watanabe wanted to incorporate hip hop, fitting in with the series' original goals and themes. While several staff members wanted him to bring back Cowboy Bebop composer Yoko Kanno, Watanabe was reluctant as he wanted to use professional hip hop artists. The soundtrack was collaboratively composed by Shinji "Tsutchie" Tsuchida of Shakkazombie; American musician Fat Jon; Nujabes, a DJ known for his sampling and blending of genres in tracks; and the DJ team Force of Nature, consisting of KZA and DJ Kent.

Watanabe was friends with Tsutchie and had worked with him on the final episode of Cowboy Bebop, and Nujabes was the first name which came to mind when he was thinking about the series music. Tsutchie was on board from the beginning, being intrigued by the mixing of hip hop music and samurai culture. As with the rest of production, Watanabe was heavily involved in choosing and using pieces of music. The non-standard sound design and dubbing approach, together with the improvised style of the production as a whole, meant that the composers had a harder time than expected finding suitable samples for their work. The soundtrack included original work and sampling from pre-existing tracks.

Watanabe wanted the music to be on an equal artistic and quality level to the animation, though he later noted his choice of hip hop limited the anime's audience and alienated many Japanese fans. The music was not always used either in intended scenes, or in its entirety. One example was Watanabe only using the opening section of a theme for the opening of the first episode, which was motivated by the track's unsatisfactory sound on large speakers. During production on the later episodes, there was some "chaotic" scheduling to edit and compose tracks. When asked to collaborate, Fat Jon almost cried with joy as he was a fan of Watanabe's other work. It was his first time working on an anime soundtrack. Fat Jon's approach of fading tracks into each other frustrated Watanabe as he wanted the tracks to have abrupt endings and transitions. Force of Nature were brought on board through Tsutchie, who provided samples to Watanabe. They described their contribution to the soundtrack as even more heavily influenced by hip hop than their standard work, with several of their tracks being used for battle scenes. Watanabe hired a professional DJ to perform scratches for the eyecatches.

Several other guest artists contributed to the soundtrack. Beatboxer Afra both voiced and performed the beatbox pieces for a character in the episode "The Art of Altercation". The second part of "Misguided Miscreants" included a long uninterrupted piece of Okinawan music, "Obokuri/Eeumi", which was in Watanabe's mind before the animation was created. This track was performed by singer Ikue Asazaki. For the two-part story "Lullabies of the Lost", the track "Pekambe Uk" by traditional Ainu musician Umeko Ando was licensed; Ando died shortly before the episodes aired. Yano Yuki scored the episode "Cosmic Collision", recording the music live using a theremin as she watched the completed episode. Yukiko Tsukioka sang the folk song performed by the character Sara in the story "Elegy of Entrapment", creating a new recording of it for the episode. Rapper duo Suiken & Sword provided vocals for "Hi-izuru Style", the closing track for "War of the Words".

=== Theme songs ===
The opening theme "Battlecry" was composed by Nujabes and performed by Shing02, who also wrote the lyrics. The lyrics, written in English, made use of word play and referenced the series' themes and period. In addition to the English version, Shing02 created a Japanese translation which was included in a series guidebook. Multiple ending themes were created, two of them performed by Minmi. The main ending theme was "Shiki no Uta" composed by Nujabes, with lyrics and vocals by Minmi. Minmi wrote the song to emphasise a sense of longing, with the person singing the lyrics seeking someone and holding onto hope despite never finding the person. Her image of the song while creating the lyrics was as a dance tune, with a lonely girl in a kimono dancing through a town.

Episode 12 used the song "Who's Theme", again composed by Nujabes, and written and performed by Minmi. For Episode 17, the final episode in the series' original television broadcast, Tsutchie created the original track "You" without consulting the other staff. Performed by the singer Kazami, the track was a mid-tempo ballad contrasting the rapping vocals dominating the series. The lyrics of "You" were written by Lori Fine. Tsutchie had originally been asked for a rap track, but ignored this request. For the episode "Baseball Blues", Tsutchie created the ending theme "Fly", with lyrics and vocals by Azuma Riki. The final episode's ending theme was "San Francisco", licensed from the rapper band Midicronica.

== Albums ==
=== Departure ===
Samurai Champloo Music Record: Departure

Soundtrack album by Nujabes, Fat Jon
- Released: June 23, 2004
- Genre: Hip Hop
- Length: 68:12
- Label: Victor Entertainment
- Producers: Nujabes, Fat Jon

The CD album Samurai Champloo Music Record: Departure was released on June 23, 2004, parallel with Masta by Victor Entertainment under their JVC label. A vinyl reprint was released by Victor Entertainment's FlyingDog label on April 24, 2022. The music on the album was composed and produced by Nujabes and Fat Jon, included Shing02's opening theme "BattleCry" and Minmi's ending theme "Shiki no Uta", and was dominated by soft and low-tempo tracks.

No.	Title	Producer	Length
1.	"Battlecry"	Nujabes	3:22
2.	"The Space Between Two World"	Nujabes	4:42
3.	"Aruarian Dance"	Nujabes	4:10
4.	"Kujaku"	Nujabes	7:02
5.	"Mystline"	Nujabes	4:50
6.	"1st. Samurai"	Nujabes	3:13
7.	"Ole"	Fat Jon	3:28
8.	"624 Part 2"	Fat Jon	3:46
9.	"Genome"	Fat Jon	3:37
10.	"No Way Back"	Fat Jon	3:21
11.	"Funkin"	Fat Jon	3:37
12.	"Stay"	Fat Jon	3:44
13.	"Chambers"	Fat Jon	3:45
14.	"Ask"	Fat Jon	3:22
15.	"How You Feel"	Fat Jon	4:29
16.	"624 Part 1"	Fat Jon	2:44
17.	"Shiki no Uta"	Nujabes	5:00
Total length:			68:12 (1:08:12)

=== Masta ===
Samurai Champloo Music Record: Masta

Soundtrack album by Tsutchie & Force of Nature
- Released: June 23, 2004
- Genre: Hip hop
- Length: 74:46
- Label: Victor Entertainment
- Producers: Tsutchie, Force of Nature

The CD album Samurai Champloo Music Record: Masta was released on June 23, 2004, parallel with Departure, by Victor Entertainment under their JVC label. A vinyl reprint was released by Victor Entertainment's FlyingDog label on April 24, 2022. The music was composed and produced by Tsutchie and Force of Nature, and included the ending theme "You". Described as a "yang" compared to the "yin" themes of Departure, the album focused on higher-tempo and energetic tracks.

No.	Title	Producer	Length
1.	"vagrancy"	Force of Nature	3:08
2.	"mist"	Force of Nature	3:44
3.	"judgement on"	Force of Nature	3:03
4.	"loading zone"	Force of Nature	4:29
5.	"paranoid"	Force of Nature	3:21
6.	"silver children"	Force of Nature	3:56
7.	"the long way of drums"	Force of Nature	2:24
8.	"sneak chamber"	Force of Nature	3:15
9.	"new dimension"	Force of Nature	3:15
10.	"raw material"	Tsutchie	4:52
11.	"dry"	Tsutchie	4:20
12.	"breezin'"	Tsutchie	4:20
13.	"tubed (drum please!!!)"	Tsutchie	4:31
14.	"pretending to..."	Tsutchie	4:32
15.	"seventythree (i ask)"	Tsutchie	4:48
16.	"I sighed"	Tsutchie	3:44
17.	"sincerely"	Tsutchie	4:48
18.	"numbernine (back in TYO)"	Tsutchie	3:27
19.	"YOU"	Tsutchie feat. kazami	4:57
Total length:			74:46 (1:14:46)

=== Impression ===
Samurai Champloo Music Record: Impression

Soundtrack album by Nujabes, Force of Nature, Fat Jon, MINMI
- Released: September 22, 2004
- Genre: Hip Hop
- Length: 70:21
- Label: Victor Entertainment
- Producers: Fat Jon, Nujabes, Force of Nature, Minmi

The CD album Samurai Champloo Music Record: Impression was released on September 22, 2004, parallel with Playlist by Victor Entertainment under their JVC label. A vinyl reprint was released by Victor Entertainment's FlyingDog label on May 18, 2022. All but one track were composed and produced by Fat Jon, Nujabes and Force of Nature. "Who's Theme" was produced and composed by Minmi and Nujabes. Compared to other albums, it features a variety of styles and tempos between the different composers.

No.	Title	Producer	Length
1.	"Just Forget"	Force of Nature	3:55
2.	"Nightshift"	Force of Nature	4:44
3.	"Hiji Suru STYLE" (feat. Suiken & S-Word)	Force of Nature	3:43
4.	"The Stroll"	Force of Nature	2:56
5.	"Death Wish"	Force of Nature	2:54
6.	"Set It Off"	Force of Nature	2:44
7.	"The Million Way of Drum"	Force of Nature	2:48
8.	"A Space in Air in Space in Air (Interlude)"	Nujabes	1:13
9.	"Sanctuary Ship"	Nujabes	4:17
10.	"Haiku (Interlude)"	Nujabes	1:15
11.	"Tsurugi no Mai"	Nujabes	3:26
12.	"Dead Season"	Nujabes	1:27
13.	"Decade (Interlude)"	Nujabes	1:50
14.	"World Without Words"	Nujabes	6:14
15.	"Kodama (Interlude)"	Nujabes	1:07
16.	"Silver Morning"	Nujabes	3:37
17.	"Bracelet"	Fat Jon	3:43
18.	"In Position"	Fat Jon	3:53
19.	"Night Out"	Fat Jon	2:14
20.	"Not Quite Seleah"	Fat Jon	2:02
21.	"Labyrinth Statistic"	Fat Jon	2:05
22.	"Here and There"	Fat Jon	3:17
23.	"Who's Theme"	Minmi	4:57
Total length:			70:21

=== Playlist ===
Samurai Champloo Music Record: Playlist

Soundtrack album by Tsutchie
- Released: September 22, 2004
- Genre: Hip Hop
- Length: 75:35
- Label: Victor Entertainment
- Producer: Tsutchie

The CD album Samurai Champloo Music Record: Playlist was released on September 22, 2004, parallel with Impression by Victor Entertainment under their JVC label. It was released in North America by Geneon Entertainment on September 26, 2006, under the title Samurai Champloo Music Record 2: playlist. A vinyl reprint was released by Victor Entertainment's FlyingDog label on May 18, 2022. The entire album was composed and produced by Tsutchie, featuring consistent "soft" and "edgy" tracks compared to the parallel album's variety, and included the ending theme "Fly".

No.	Title	Length
1.	"Thank You"	4:15
2.	"Yet? Why Not?"	3:46
3.	"Strike Back"	4:13
4.	"Let Me Know What U Think"	5:04
5.	"Mists"	4:10
6.	"Flip"	2:46
7.	"Absolute"	5:20
8.	"Adapt Myself"	4:58
9.	"Tuned"	2:48
10.	"No Icon"	3:09
11.	"Stretch Out"	4:00
12.	"Process"	4:41
13.	"Reflective"	4:31
14.	"Deeper Than Words"	4:58
15.	"2 Messages"	5:23
16.	"The Updater"	3:57
17.	"Offers"	3:35
18.	"Fly"	3:53
Total length:		75:35

== Other releases ==
"Shiki no Uta" was released as part of Minmi's single Ai no Mi alongside the titular track on March 31, 2004, as her first music release of the year. The track was also included on Minmi's album Imagine on June 30. Midicronica's "San Francisco" was released on their debut album #501 on April 25, 2004, through the KSR label. "You" was released as a single under the title You ～Himawari～ on August 18 of that year. Geneon Entertainment released an English album, including a selection of twenty tracks from the anime, on January 11, 2005. A limited vinyl release of selected tracks, titled Samurai Champloo: The Way of the Samurai, was released in 2007 by Fat Jon's label Ample Soul.

Two remixes of "Shiki no Uta" were released on anime theme tribute albums; ATeam's Anime House Project -Oshare selection vol.1- in October 2009, and Victor Entertainment's Rasmus Faber presents Platina Jazz ~Anime Standards Vol.6~ in October 2019. Minmi herself created a remix in tribute to Nujabes; one version in Japanese, and one using English lyrics created by YouTube fan cover creator Sapphire. The digital single, Shiki No Uta (Tribute to Samurai Champloo), was published by Domo Records on July 19, 2019.

=== Samurai Champloo: Sidetracked Original Soundtrack ===
The anime was adapted into a 2006 action-adventure video game by Grasshopper Manufacture, Samurai Champloo: Sidetracked. Due to difficulties with licensing, none of the anime's soundtrack was used for the in-game music. The music was composed by Masafumi Takada, a long-time collaborator of Suda's and a core member of Grasshopper's in-house sound team. Takada was a fan of the anime's soundtrack, listening to it and emulating it as much as he could within his original music. Sidetracked was Takada's first time using the Logic Pro workstation, finding it well suited to creating the game's soundtrack. "Battlecry" was used in the game's opening. A soundtrack album was released on March 1, 2006, by Scitron Digital Contents.

== Reception ==
In 2006, the ambient soundtrack was ranked by IGN as tenth among their Top Ten Anime Themes and Soundtracks of All Time. The soundtrack is attributed as an early example of lo-fi hip hop, particularly the track "Aruarian Dance". In a 2020 article on NPR, Jon Lewis noted its influence on similar music popular at the time, praising Nujabes's opening theme.

While he gave no specific commentary, Dave Halverson of Play Magazine praised the series music. Tasha Robinson of Sci-Fi Weekly noted the strong musical identity of the show, though finding it less varied than Watanabe's earlier entry Cowboy Bebop. Salvan Bonaminio, writing for The Escapist, positively noted the music's role in the anime's blend of cultures. Anime News Network's James Beckett praised the integration of music into the anime's presentation and style as one of the series' strengths. Nick Browne of THEM Anime said the music was perfectly suited for the show, in addition to giving high praise to the opening and ending themes, citing the music as one of the series strong points. Mike Dent of Otaku USA Magazine summarised the music by saying "the collaborative efforts add a vibrant and moving atmosphere to each episode".

== See also ==
- Nujabes
- Music of Cowboy Bebop
