= The Essence of J. Rawls =

Studio album by J. Rawls
- Released: May 8, 2001
- Genre: Hip-hop
- Length: 56:47 • Original; 76:02 • Redux
- Label: Groove Attack Productions
- Producer: J. Rawls

Singles from The Essence Of J. Rawls
- 1. "Check the Clock" Released: 2000; 2. "Great Live Caper" Released: 2001; 3. "They Can’t See Me" Released: 2001

Fifteenth Anniversary Redux cover

Professional ratings
Review scores
Source	Rating
AllMusic	4/5 stars
HipHopCore	4/5 stars
HipHopGoldenAge	7.5/10
MvRemix	8/10
NME	4.5/5 stars
Visions	10/12

The Essence of J. Rawls is a studio album by American record producer J. Rawls. It was released by Groove Attack Productions on May 8, 2001. In 2016, Rawls released The Essence of J. Rawls: Fifteenth Anniversary Redux, for Record Store Day.

== Track listing ==
No.	Title	Length
1.	"What You Want Is?" (featuring Pase Rock)	1:30
2.	"Superhero" (featuring Mass Influence)	3:24
3.	"Birds Of A Feather" (featuring Top Emcees)	5:18
4.	"Elegy" (featuring Rubix)	3:55
5.	"Great Live Caper" (featuring J-Live)	4:56
6.	"Meniscus" (featuring Doseone and Fat Jon)	5:09
7.	"Blue #2" (featuring Holmskillit)	3:53
8.	"Cold Turkey" (featuring Capital D and Mr. Greenweedz)	4:06
9.	"Far Away" (featuring Apani B. Fly and Mr. Complex)	4:36
10.	"Lone Catalysts (Remix)" (featuring J. Sands)	4:05
11.	"Check The Clock" (featuring Grap Luva and J. Sands)	4:15
12.	"Nommo" (featuring Asheru)	3:52
13.	"They Can’t See Me"	3:57
14.	"Blue #2 (Saxophone Reprise)"	3:51
Total length:		56:47

Fifteenth Anniversary Redux Bonus Tracks
No.	Title	Length
15.	"Listening" (featuring Doseone)	5:15
16.	"We" (featuring Talib Kweli and Makeba Mooncycle)	3:33
17.	"Aquarius" (featuring Holmskillit, Rubix and Wordsworth)	3:20
18.	"I Said It" (featuring Spirit)	3:50
19.	"Rio (Remix)"	2:30
Total length:		76:02
