= Kommunicator =

Studio album by Five Deez
- Released: February 20, 2006
- Genre: Hip hop
- Length: 51:09
- Label: Rapster Records [Worldwide], Hostess Entertainment Unlimited [JP]
- Producer: Fat Jon

Five Deez chronology
Kinkynasti (2003)	Kommunicator (2006)	Slow Children Playing (2006)

Singles from Kommunicator
- 1. "Fugg That / BMW" Released: 2006; 2. "Let The People Know / Black Rushmore" Released: 2006

Alternative covers
- Promo cover

Kommunicator is the third studio album by Five Deez, an American hip-hop group. The album features a total of 11 tracks released on February 20, 2006, under Rapster Records in the US, Germany and Europe. In Japan, the album would be under Hostess Entertainment Unlimited.

== Reception ==
Professional ratings
Review scores
Source	Rating
AllMusic	4.5/5 stars
Tiny Mix Tapes	4/5 stars
Exclaim!	favorable
CMJ	favorable

Stewart Mason of AllMusic wrote saying the album has "a 2006 updating of hip-house, marrying contemporary trends in both underground hip-hop and post-glitch electronic dance music, but largely steering clear of the pitfalls of both." Dave Gurney of Tiny Mix Tapes said, "While such disparate elements may make a disjointed mess in the hands of less skilled producers, Fat Jon's skills hold these pieces together and give the track an infectious and irrepressible energy." Exclaim!'s Kevin Jones said Five Deez "loat hip-hop up to the outer reaches of the atmosphere with a creative blend of complex rhythms, an exhaustive pallet of futuristic sounds, and a consistent amount of soul that forms the glue holding the together the many sonically exploratory elements."

== Track listing ==
No.	Title	Length
1.	"Kommunicator"	6:08
2.	"Fugg That"	4:04
3.	"Let the People Know"	3:38
4.	"Black Rushmore"	4:32
5.	"When the Silence Is Gone"	5:17
6.	"So Good"	4:01
7.	"Fifth Degree"	5:51
8.	"BMW"	4:26
9.	"From Sorrow"	3:40
10.	"Sapphire"	5:28
11.	"The Last Time"	3:55
Total length:		51:09
