= Force of Nature (duo) =

Japanese hip-hop duo

- Origin: Tokyo, Japan
- Genres: Hip Hop, Instrumental hip hop, house, disco, techno, dub music, electronica
- Years active: 2000–present
- Labels: Dimid Recordings, Libyus Music, Victor Entertainment, Exceptional Records, Endless Flight
- Members: KZA; DJ Kent

Force of Nature (stylized as FORCE OF NATURE) is a hip-hop DJ and production duo from Tokyo, Japan. The group is composed of members Ikuzumi Kitazawa (北沢 郁美, Kitazawa Ikuzumi), known by his stage name KZA, and Kento Sasaki (佐々木 健太, Sasaki Kento), known by his stage name DJ Kent or The Backwoods. Known internationally for their DJ work as well as their production, the duo is also credited as part of the production team that scored the music for the anime series Samurai Champloo.

== Biography ==
=== Early years with Yotsukaido Nature ===
In the 1990s, KZA (then known by the name Kita & Zawa), DJ Kent, and Akira "Mic Akira" Nakano were originally in a Japanese hip-hop group called Yotsukaido Nature (四街道ネイチャー), which was named after the city of Yotsukaidō, Chiba Prefecture, Japan. KZA, a founding member of the group, was an emcee with Mic Akira at the time while Kent joined the group as a DJ and producer after the departure of the original DJ for the group. Yotsukaido Nature made appearances such as on the track "Ookinaosewa (Say What)" from Japanese hip-hop group Kimidori's self-titled album in 1993. They would go on to release their self-titled EP, the single "HIGH-NIKKEN", and a collaboration with Japanese punk rock band Super Stupid in 1995. In 1996, the group would also take part in the hip-hop concerts Thumpin' Camp and the Little Bird Nation Summer Festival that were both held at the Hibiya Open-Air Concert Hall in Tokyo, Japan.

After teaming up to produce a breakbeat called "Urban Combatt 2001" for their 1998 studio album V.I.C. Tomorrow, KZA and DJ Kent took the name "Force of Nature" as the name of their production project, which was a play on the word "Yotsu" (meaning "fourth" which is similar to "force") and inspired by the names of both the album Done by the Forces of Nature by the American hip-hop group Jungle Brothers and the name of the American hip-hop group Naughty By Nature. After releasing two more singles for the album, Yotsukaido Nature dissolved, KZA retired as an emcee, and FORCE OF NATURE would continue as a DJ/production duo focused on instrumental music with beats inspired by hip hop, disco, techno, house music, dub music, and electronica.

=== Success as Force of Nature ===
Force of Nature would go on to become fixtures as DJs in the Japanese dance music scene and as producers that remixed tracks for several artists such as Unkle, DJ Shadow, Shakkazombie, YOU THE ROCK★, Ayumi Hamasaki, Five Deez, Nigo, ECD, Rhymester, Halcali, Suiken of Nitro Microphone Underground, D.C.P.R.G. (DATE COURSE PENTAGON ROYAL GARDEN), Sly Mongoose, Tokona X, and Keiichi Sokabe. In 2002, Force of Nature released their first instrumental album The Forces Of Nature.

Japanese anime television and film director Shinichiro Watanabe approached the duo to help create the score of the anime series Samurai Champloo along with established hip-hop producers Fat Jon of Five Deez, Tsutchie of Shakkazombie, and Nujabes. According to Kent, the group developed their beats by looking at production art and stories from Watanabe for inspiration. The group produced several songs for the series including the rap track "ズルSTYLE (Hiji Zuru STYLE)" featuring rappers Suiken and S-Word of Nitro Microphone Underground. Their contributions were a part of the Victor Entertainment compilation albums Samurai Champloo Music Record: Masta with Tsutchie and Samurai Champloo Music Record: Impression with Nujabes and Fat Jon. Released on June 23, 2004, Samurai Champloo Music Record: Masta featured nine songs by Force of Nature while Samurai Champloo Music Record: Impression, released on September 22, 2004, featured seven Force of Nature songs. The 2005 compilation Samurai Champloo Music Record: Katana by Geneon Entertainment features previously released songs by all four of the producers with Force of Nature contributing three songs for the album.

In 2004, the duo released their second album Force Of Nature II. Force of Nature would also take part in collaboration releases with producer Jay Dee a.k.a. J. Dilla of the American hip-hop group Slum Village, DJ Uppercut, and Dev Large of the Japanese hip-hop group Buddha Brand. The duo's track "Down To Earth" was released with Jay Dee & DJ Uppercut's "Crypto" while the single "Just Landed" was released with Dev Large's "Trans Tokyo Ghetto Funk Express" in Listening Is Believing Volume 1.

In 2006, the duo released their third album III. The group also released the compilation CD/DVD collection Best Setting Sound 01. In 2007, Force of Nature remixed "I'm Coming Out" by Diana Ross for the compilation album Diana Ross & the Supremes: Remixes and produced the song "Majestic Two" for the compilation album Bathroom #01 by Fat Jon.

In 2009, Force of Nature teamed with American producer Eric Duncan a.k.a. Dr. Dunks of the DJ duos Rub-n-Tug and Still Going of DFA Records to release the 15 track album and DVD C.O.M.B.i. - Chill On My Buttas! on the C.O.M.B.i. label.

In 2013, Force of Nature released the compilation album Expansions. Unlike the previous compilation, the album includes remixes by British electronic artist Lone, Swiss DJ/producer Lexx, Dr. Dunks of Rub-n-Tug, British producer The Revenge, German artist DJ T., and British producer Tony Tobias.

== Other projects ==
In addition to their work as Force of Nature, both KZA and DJ Kent have both released solo projects away from the group. KZA released the albums Dig And Edit in October 2009, An EP in December 2009, and Dig & Edit 2 in January 2014. KZA and the Mule Musiq label also started the Let's Get Lost label, releasing a series of singles and compilations composed of re-edits with KZA contributing several releases.

DJ Kent is a part of the group Galarude with musicians Hiroshi Kawanabe of TOKYO NO.1 SOUL SET and bassist Noriyoshi Sasanuma of Sly Mongoose. In 2004, his mix album (B)ape Sounds Mixtape was released by Ape Sounds Records, a label under the A Bathing Ape clothing brand founded by designer and DJ/producer Nigo. In 2005, DJ Kent joined with Swiss artists/producers Yanneck "Quarion" Salvo and Adrien "Rosario" Mazzei of the music duo Square Meal to form the group Enterplay. The group released their debut album Water & Dust. Under the moniker of The Backwoods, DJ Kent released his self titled album in July 2010.

== Discography ==
=== Albums ===
- The Forces of Nature (2002)
- Force of Nature II (2004)
- III (2006)

=== Compilation albums ===
- Best Setting Sound 01 (2006)
- Expansions (2013)

=== Soundtrack albums ===
- Samurai Champloo Music Record: Masta (2004) (with Tsutchie)
- Samurai Champloo Music Record: Impression (2004) (with Fat Jon and Nujabes)

=== Singles ===
- Loopaddiction (2003)
- Force Field / Magic Hills (2004)
- A Dark Nebula (2004)
- Unstoppable (2005)
- Axiomatic / Liberate (2005)
- Black Moon (2006)
- Straight Ahead (Long Version) / Traderoute (Long Version) (2006)
- Afroshock (2007)
- To The Brain (2007)
- Sequencer (2007)
- Remixed (2008)
- III: European Edition (2008)

=== Collaborative albums ===
- C.O.M.B.i. - Chill On My Buttas! (2009) (with Eric Duncan)
