= Çà et là du Japon =

Studio album by Pizzicato Five
- Released: January 1, 2001
- Genre: Shibuya-kei
- Length: 61:38
- Label: Readymade
- Producer: Yasuharu Konishi

Pizzicato Five chronology
24 Decembre (2000)	Çà et là du Japon (2001)	R.I.P.: Big Hits and Jet Lags 1998–2001 (2001)

Singles from Çà et là du Japon
- 1. "À Tokyo" Released: November 27, 2021

Alternative cover
- 2006 reissue

Çà et là du Japon (さ・え・ら ジャポン, Sa•e•ra Japon; transl. Here and There in Japan) is the thirteenth and final studio album by Japanese pop band Pizzicato Five. The album was released on January 1, 2001 by Readymade Records. Like many of the band's later albums, Çà et là du Japon is set in a famous city of the world during a specific time of the year, in this case Tokyo in winter. Çà et là du Japon differs from other Pizzicato Five albums, in that it features several guest vocalists, songwriters, and lead vocalist Maki Nomiya appears on only a few of its songs.

Çà et là du Japon was reissued on March 31, 2006.

== Track listing ==
All music is composed by Yasuharu Konishi, except where noted.

No.	Title	Lyrics	Music	Length
1.	"1 Janvier" (一月一日)	Senge Takatomi	Ue Sanemichi	1:14
2.	"Nonstop to Tokyo" (ノンストップ・トゥ・トーキョー)	Konishi		4:28
3.	"Kimigayo" (君が代)		Akimori Hayashi; Yoshiisa Oku; Franz Eckert	0:31
4.	"Sakura Sakura" (さくらさくら)	Konishi		3:54
5.	"Moderns" (現代人)	Konishi		3:27
6.	"Kimono" (キモノ)	Konishi; Ron Mael; Russell Mael		5:31
7.	"Fashion People"	Konishi		4:04
8.	"In America" (アメリカでは)	Shuntarō Tanikawa	Toshiro Mayuzumi	5:26
9.	"Gatta Call'em All!" (ポケモン言えるかな?)	Akihito Toda	Hirokazu Tanaka	4:41
10.	"Grand Bazar" (グランバザール)		Ichizo Seo	0:19
11.	"24 Decembre" (12月24日)	Konishi		6:11
12.	"Sukiyaki Song" (スキヤキ・ソング)	Konishi		3:33
13.	"À Tokyo" (東京の合唱～午後のカフェで)	Konishi; Yu Takemae		5:54
14.	"Çà et là" (さえら)	Bertrand Burgalat	Burgalat	4:59
15.	"Le Grand Tokyo" (大東京)			3:46
16.	"Aiueo" (愛餓を)	Takashi Matsumoto	Eiichi Ohtaki	3:40
Total length:				61:38

Notes

- "Gatta Call'em All!" is a re-recording of "Pokémon Ieru ka na?" (ポケモン言えるかな?), written by Akihito Toda and Hirokazu Tanaka and originally performed by Imakuni? and Raymond Johnson.

== Personnel ==
Additional musicians

- Takashi Nagazumi – vocals on "1 Janvier"
- Shigeru Matsuzaki – vocals on "Nonstop to Tokyo" and "À Tokyo"
- Izumi Yukimura – vocals on "Sakura Sakura" and "In America"
- Masumi Arichika – vocals on "Kimono"
- Sparks – vocals on "Kimono"
- Scott Addison – vocals on "Fashion People"
- Ben Human – vocals on "Fashion People"
- Duke Aces – vocals on "In America"
- Imakuni? – vocals on "Gatta Call'em All!"
- Raymond Johnson – vocals on "Gatta Call'em All!"
- Hiroko Ohashi – vocals on "Gatta Call'em All!"
- Pokémon Kids – vocals on "Gatta Call'em All!"
- Yossie – vocals on "Gatta Call'em All!"
- Rocketman – vocals on "24 Decembre"
- Ronnie – vocals on "24 Decembre"
- Ken Yokoyama – vocals on "Sukiyaki Song"
- You the Rock – vocals on "À Tokyo"
- Bertrand Burgalat – vocals on "Çà et là"
- Clémentine – vocals on "Aiueo"

== Charts ==
Chart (2001)	Peak position
Japanese Albums (Oricon)	44
