= A Thousand Words =

A Thousand Words may refer to:

- A Thousand Words (album), 2008, by Belgian Indie/Electronica artist Styrofoam
- A Thousand Words (film), 2012, starring Eddie Murphy
- "A Thousand Words", a 1997 song by Savage Garden
- "A Thousand Words", a 2012 song by Hoobastank from Fight or Flight
- A picture is worth a thousand words
- The Thousand Character Classic, a Chinese poem used as a primer for teaching Chinese characters to children

== See also ==
- 1000 Words (disambiguation)
