= Five Deez =

American hip hop group

- Origin: Cincinnati, Ohio, United States
- Genre: Hip hop
- Years active: 1993–present
- Labels: LandSpeed, !K7, Counterflow, Rapster, Ample Soul
- Members: Fat Jon; Pase Rock; Kyle David; Sonic
- Website: http://www.fivedeez.com

Five Deez is an American hip hop group from Cincinnati, Ohio and a part of the Wanna Battle collective, which also includes DJ Hi-Tek, Talib Kweli, Rubix, and Lone Catalysts. The group consists of members: Fat Jon the Ample Soul Physician (John Marshall), Pase Rock (Patrick Johnson), Kyle David (also known as Chilly Most), and Sonic (Corey Brown). Fat Jon currently resides in Frankfurt, Germany; while Pase Rock lives in New York, with Kyle and Sonic remaining in Cincinnati.

== Origins and collaborations ==
The members of Five Deez originally met while attending Walnut Hills High School in Cincinnati, OH. Fat Jon, Sonic and Kyle David met in band class while Pase met Fat Jon during lunch after moving to the school at a later time. They chose the name "Five Deez" as simplification of the term "fifth dimension" of which they describe as "the realm where you experience music." They chose this name because another group was going by the name Fifth Dimension at the time of their formation.

Five Deez has toured and worked with such artists as Rakim, BlackStar, Mr. Dibbs, Hieroglyphics and J-Live over their career. Five Deez have also worked extensively with members of the Japanese hip hop scene, as they have also gained a strong fanbase in the country. Japanese artists that they collaborated with include Nujabes, Shing02, LEMS, Haruka Nakamura, and Force of Nature.

== Style/Influence ==
Five Deez's influence comes from many different genres of music. Their sound derives elements from electronic, hip-hop, jazz, house, and techno music. One of the group's major strengths is the fact that they move from straightforward hip-hop to up-beat, danceable music. Some critics have even called them the "kings of dance-rap.”

They are also well known for straying away from the hip-hop norm, as they have included live-instrumentation, instrumental songs, and even singing on their albums. Their beats combine the mellow, organic sound of electronica and trip hop with the "boom-bap" of hip-hop. They draw samples from many different instrumental sources such as violins, flutes, synths, and record samples. Their subject matter stretches a wide spectrum, from songs about dealings with women, and dissing wack MCs to their exploits with shoplifting and dates with aliens.

They have described their inspiration and influences as coming from such artists as: Prince, Steely Dan, Miles Davis, the Neptunes, Kraftwerk and others. They were also strongly influenced by old-school hip-hop (as seen on their remake of the Slick Rick song, Hey Young World of the same name). Fat Jon has also said some of his influence comes from anime and science fiction.

One point that they emphasize about their music and releases of albums, is that no record sounds the same as another.

== Releases ==
Five Deez's first release was the Secret Agent Number 005 The E.P. on September 27, 2000 on Landspeed Records. This album was a precursor to the first full-length debut Koolmotor released on November 27, 2001 on Counterflow Recordings. Koolmotor (describing the sound of the album, like a "cool motor") contains two songs from Secret Agent Number 005 The E.P., B.E.A.T. and Dope. Koolmotor was released to positive reviews, as critics praised the experimentation of the album and the sound that was radically different from that of other mainstream and underground artists.

Their follow-up album Kinkynasti (another name for Cincinnati, Ohio) was released on !K7 Records on September 2, 2003. Kinkynasti garnered mostly positive reviews as the group moved towards making more of a hip-hop, dance record with this release. Some criticism included the lack of fluidity of the album, going from upbeat songs (Funky, Kissyface) to instrumental songs (Rain, the Ocean), but overall the response was positive.

Kommunicator, their next release, came on February 21, 2006 on Rapster Records. The members of Five Deez have described this as a "concept record" with the album being a transmission from an unknown source. This album was better received than Kinkynasti, with critics describing the album as going back to their Koolmotor roots. Other critics have described this album as one that "bridges the gap between hip-hop and electronic music.”

They have also released a previously Japan-only release, Slow Children Playing, in the U.S. on July 24, 2006 on Ample Soul (Fat Jon's label). This album is a collection of older, previously unreleased songs by the group.

== Other projects ==
Individual members of Five Deez have worked on or are currently working on other projects outside of the Five Deez name.

Fat Jon has done the most work outside of the group, most notably his instrumental albums that have gained positive reviews. His most notable collaboration has been with rapper/producer J. Rawls, of which they go by the name 3582. He has also collaborated with German electronic minimalist Pole on a number of tracks that have been included on his self-titled debut album. He also formed the group Rebel Clique with Amleset Solomon (who appeared on a number of Kinkynasti tracks) where they released their debut album Unique Connection on Ample Soul (of which was released in 2006 in the US). Fat Jon also expanded his resume by contributing music to the hip-hop themed anime, Samurai Champloo. He also has worked with Belgian musician Styrofoam where they released their debut album, The Same Channel in October 2006.

Pase Rock has also released a Japan-only solo album, Bullshit as Usual in 2003 on Hyde Out Productions, a project he did with Japanese producer Nujabes. He has said he is currently working on follow-up solo project of which no release date has been set. Furthermore, he collaborates with the Spank Rock crew frequently. He is also gaining much fame as a DJ, doing sets for a number of celebrity parties including that of Jessica Simpson, Justin Timberlake, Snoop Dogg, and Larry Flynt.

Sonic is also working on a solo album, to be released on Fat Jon's Ample Soul Records.

== Discography ==
=== Albums ===
- Secret Agent Number 005 The E.P. (2000)
- Koolmotor (2001)
- Koolmotor Instrumentals (2002)
- Kinkynasti (2003)
- Kinkynasti Instrumentals (2xLP) (2003)
- Kommunicator (2006)
- Slow Children Playing (2006)
- Table Noise Volume 1-3 (2008)
