= 1000 Words =

1000 Words may refer to:

- "1000 Words" (Final Fantasy X-2), a song for the video game Final Fantasy X-2
- 1000-Word Philosophy, an online philosophy anthology
- "Thousand Character Classic", a Chinese poem used as a primer for teaching Chinese characters to children

== See also ==
- A Thousand Words (disambiguation)
