= One (album) =

Albums with the title "One" or "1" include:

- 1 (B1A4 album), 2012
- 1 (Beatles album), a compilation released in 2000
- 1 (The Black Heart Procession album), 1998
- #1 (Demy album), 2012
- #1 (Felix album), 1993
- #1 (Fischerspooner album), 2001
- 1 (Julio Iglesias album), a greatest hits album, 2011
- 1: The Collection, by Julio Iglesias, 2014
- 1 (The Motors album), 1977
- 1 (Pole album), 1998
- 1 (Zara Larsson album), 2014
- I (Cursed album), 2003, later reissued as "One"
- 1.0 (album), by Black Rain, 1995
- One (Ahmad Jamal album), 1979
- One (Angela Aki EP), 2005
- One (Arashi album), 2005
- One (Bee Gees album), 1989
- One (Bob James album), 1974
- One (Bonnie Pink album), 2009
- One (C418 album), 2012
- One (Dirty Vegas album), 2004
- One (Edita Abdieski album), 2011
- One (George Jones and Tammy Wynette album), 1995
- One (Ida Corr album), 2008
- One (Junho album), 2015
- One (Maher Zain album), 2016
- One (Matthew Shipp album), 2005
- One (Me Phi Me album), 1992
- One (Neal Morse album), 2004
- One (NoMeansNo album), 2000
- One (Onewe album), 2020
- One (The Panic Channel album), often stylized ONe, 2006
- One (Sevendust album), 2026
- One (Sister2Sister album), 2000
- One (Tesseract album), 2011
- One, an alternate title for the self-titled Three Dog Night, 1968
- One (Yuval Ron album), 2003
- One (Hellbound), by Demiricous, 2006
- One, by Crown City Rockers, 2001
- One, by Planetshakers, 2009
- One, by Sarah Burgess, 2008
