= Wave motion (disambiguation) =

Wave motion as a physical phenomena is covered in Wave.

It may also refer to:

- Wave Motion, a scientific journal
- Wave Motion, a music album
- Wave effect, a type of liquid destabilization in tanker trucks
