= Tephlon Funk! =

- Cover for the 1st issue of Tephlon Funk!

Publication information
- Publisher: Dark Horse Books
- Format: Ongoing series
- Genre: Fiction/Coming Of Age
- Publication date: 2022
- No. of issues: 8

Creative team
- Created by: Stephane Metayer
- Written by: Stephane Metayer
- Artist(s): David Tako, Nicolas Safe

Collected editions
- Tephlon Funk!: ISBN 9781506734026

Tephlon Funk! is a creator-owned graphic novel series created by Stephane Metayer and was originally self-published on October 25, 2015.

== Background ==
Originally created in 2004, Stephane Metayer first came up with the concept while still in High School. He came up with the title in 2005 from listening to Ready To Die however most of story's influence came from Illmatic. In 2014, French artist David Tako took over as illustrator along with Nico Safe. On October 2015, Stephane launched a crowdfunding campaign through Kickstarter to help finish and self publish the graphic novel. The project was a success and raised over $22,000 in pledges. The 1st issue was released in December 2015 with a limited run of 100 copies. The single comic has since been reselling on eBay for upwards of $90 and up. On May 5, 2022 Dark Horse Comics announced they had acquired the publishing rights to the series under their trade paperback imprint Dark Horse Books.

== Plot ==
Inez Jozlyn meets a mysterious classmate named Gabriel Ainsley who asks her to help him search for Tephlon Funk. However Cameron, an undercover New York City cop is also searching for it and somehow has a long history with Gabriel. The series takes place in the mid '90s and is heavily inspired by both Hip-Hop and Anime from that era.

== Characters ==
- Inez Jozlyn A troubled 14-year-old girl who's looking to someday escape from her circumstances and live a carefree life.
- Gabriel Ainsley Selfish, self-centered and bash 17-year-old who manipulates anyone he can to get his way.
- Cameron Phoenix An ambitious 24-year-old by the books Cop who aspires to make a difference in her community.
- Giselle Rodriguez 25-year-old Bartender with a chip on her shoulder hopes to redeem herself from past mistakes.

== Media ==
=== Soundtracks ===
In 2016, Stephane contacted Fat Jon and asked if he'd be interested in putting together a free soundtrack for the comic series:

Tephlon Funk: The Free Tape was released digitally on June 27, 2016 for free on SoundCloud. The EP features 12 Lo-fi Hip-hop tracks all produced, mixed and arranged by Fat Jon. The soundtrack was later released on vinyl with a 36-page mini comic in every copy. As well as streaming platforms Spotify and Apple Music on July 20, 2018.

Tephlon Funk: The Dope Tape was released for streaming platforms on December 18, 2020 The 2nd EP also features 12 Lo-fi Hip-hop tracks all produced, mixed and arranged by Fat Jon. A vinyl was also released with a 12x12 poster in every copy.

=== Animation ===
On July 27, 2017 a short anime teaser was released on YouTube. The animation was produced in Japan by D'art Shtajio. Fans have speculated that an anime adaptation is in the works, however there has been no official confirmation.
