= Kinkynasti =

Studio album by Five Deez
- Released: September 2, 2003
- Genre: Hip hop
- Length: 53:14
- Label: Studio !K7
- Producer: Fat Jon, Sonic

Five Deez chronology
Koolmotor (2001)	Kinkynasti (2003)	Kommunicator (2006)

Singles from Kinkynasti
- 1. "Funky / Hey Young World" Released: 2003; 2. "Kinkynasti / Kissy Face" Released: 2003

Kinkynasti is the second studio album by American hip hop group Five Deez. It was released on Studio !K7 in 2003.

== Critical reception ==
Professional ratings
Review scores
Source	Rating
AllMusic	3/5 stars
Exclaim!	favorable
PopMatters	favorable
Spin	A−
Stylus Magazine	7.6/10
Vibe	2/5 stars
XLR8R	favorable

Spin wrote that "this brainy, brawny crew straddle urban tough, dirty smoove, and indie introspective. It's a tough mix, but Pase Rock and Fat Jon the Ample Soul Physician keep it flowing like happy hour." Del F. Cowie of Exclaim! described Kinkynasti as "a cohesive and intelligently crafted affair that remains loose and carefree enough to retain and reinvigorate hip-hop's celebratory aspects." David Morris of PopMatters said, "What comes out is beautiful, funky, propulsive, and dreamy, but it is also undeniably hip-hop, and anything but soft." Gabe Gloden of Stylus Magazine found the lyrics as "sonic drapery" for Fat Jon's "discernable ear for details" in crafting party-ready hip-hop beats that grab the listeners' attention, concluding that, "Kinkynasti is one of those albums that every DJ should have in his/her bag, an album exhibiting a mood and style that could complement the flow of any dance music set." AllMusic's David Jeffries was critical of the "overall zaniness" in Fat Jon's musicianship almost obscuring the competent rapping on highlights like "Funky" and "B Girl", concluding that "[W]ith a lackluster collaboration with German dubmeister Pole behind him, Kinkynasti adds a more satisfying addition to Fat Jon's curious universe." Despite Fat Jon's production and the story raps in "Kissy Face" and "The Boostin Jam", Vibe writer David A. Herron found the record to be lackluster with the group delivering unmemorable lyrics and vocal performances on tracks that "sound like one song that goes on for much too long."

== Track listing ==
No.	Title	Producer(s)	Length
1.	"A Wonderful Place"	Fat Jon	1:05
2.	"Kinkynasti"	Fat Jon	3:37
3.	"The Boostin Jam"	Fat Jon	2:54
4.	"Another Love Affair"	Fat Jon	3:52
5.	"Four Black Dudes"	Fat Jon	3:27
6.	"Funky"	Fat Jon	4:05
7.	"The Ocean"	Fat Jon	3:52
8.	"Tonight"	Fat Jon	3:41
9.	"Kissy Face"	Fat Jon	3:17
10.	"Sextraterrestrial"	Fat Jon	3:16
11.	"Hey Young World"	Fat Jon	4:25
12.	"We Rock On"	Fat Jon	4:22
13.	"The Rain"	Sonic	3:30
14.	"B Girl"	Fat Jon	3:46
15.	"I Like It"	Fat Jon	4:05
