= The Same Channel =

Studio album by Fat Jon & Styrofoam
- Released: October 17, 2006
- Genres: Hip-hop; indie rock; electronica
- Length: 52:58
- Label: Morr Music
- Producers: Fat Jon; Styrofoam

Fat Jon chronology
Afterthought (2006)	The Same Channel (2006)	Hundred Eight Stars (2007)

Styrofoam chronology
Live (2005)	The Same Channel (2006)	A Thousand Words (2008)

The Same Channel is a collaborative studio album by American musician Fat Jon and Belgian musician Styrofoam. It was released on Morr Music in 2006.

== Critical reception ==
Professional ratings
Review scores
Source	Rating
AllMusic	4/5 stars
Alternative Press	4/5
The Stranger	3/5 stars
Tiny Mix Tapes	3/5 marks
XLR8R	favorable

Marisa Brown of AllMusic gave the album 4 stars out of 5, describing it as "an indie-electronica/hip-hop album that should thrill backpackers who are tired of soul- and funk-based beats and are looking for something fractured and galactic with that sad mechanicality that is a necessary element of any Morr Music release." Trent Moorman of The Stranger gave the album 3 stars out of 5, commenting that "Fat Jon weighs in like LL Cool J in his prime." Alan Ranta of Tiny Mix Tapes gave the album 3 stars out of 5, writing, "Production wise, Styrofoam's club-friendly, synth-driven electro-pop takes command." Steve Marchese of XLR8R stated, "As a duo, the two deftly weave their art and craft together, retaining their strengths while creating an even more taut and accessible whole." He called the album "An experimental, courageous, and wildly successful coupling of styles."

== Track listing ==
All tracks are written by Jon Marshall and Arne Van Petegem.

No.	Title	Length
1.	"Acid Rain Robot Repair"	4:06
2.	"Bleed"	7:28
3.	"Runnin' Circle"	4:11
4.	"Space Gangsta"	3:55
5.	"Nervous Inaction"	2:51
6.	"Upgrade"	5:31
7.	"Scream It Out"	4:43
8.	"The Middle"	8:26
9.	"Generic Genes (Spare Parts)"	4:54
10.	"Upgrade (Grace Period Mix)"	6:53
Total length:		52:58

The enhanced CD version of the album contains a music video for "Space Gangsta".

== Personnel ==
Credits adapted from liner notes.

- Jon Marshall – vocals, production, recording
- Arne Van Petegem – vocals, production, recording
- Grace Period – remix (10)
- Human Empire – design
