= Shakkazombie =

Japanese hip hop group

- Origin: Japan
- Genre: Hip Hop
- Years active: 1993–present
- Labels: Cutting Edge, Natural Foundation, Rhythm Republic
- Members: Hide-Bowie; Tsutchie
- Past members: Osumi

Shakkazombie (シャカゾンビ) is a Japanese hip-hop group. Formed in the 1990s, the group consists of Osumi a.k.a. Big-O (Takeshi Osumi), Hide-Bowie a.k.a. Ignition Man (Hidehiro Iguchi), and Tsutchie (Shinji Tsuchida). One of Japan's influential hip-hop groups, they are known for featuring & introducing many artists in their collaborations such as Nitro Microphone Underground.

== History ==
The group was formed in 1993 when DJ & producer Tsutchie joined with emcees Osumi and Hide-Bowie, who were already making hip-hop music at the time. Hide-Bowie played jazz music before becoming a hip-hop artist and both he and Osumi were influenced by the hip-hop lifestyle. In his first year of high school, Tsutchie was inspired by hip-hop acts such as Run DMC and the Beastie Boys which lead to him becoming a beatmaker.

In 1995, Shakkazombie released their debut single Shakkattack. They later formed the Ookami Crew collective with Japanese hip-hop group Buddha Brand, releasing the single "大怪我 (Ookega, Serious Injury)" in 1996. On July 7, 1996, the group along with Buddha Brand, Rhymester, Muro, YOU THE ROCK★, King Giddra, Soul Scream, and several Japanese hip-hop artists took part in the hip-hop concert & festival Thumpin Camp at the Hibiya Open-Air Concert Hall in Tokyo, Japan. Organized by Japanese rapper ECD, the event was later made into a hip-hop documentary similar to the 1995 American hip-hop documentary The Show and a soundtrack was released with Shakkazombie, ECD, Buddha Brand, You the Rock★, K Dub Shine of King Giddra, DJ/production duo Force of Nature, and other artists.

In July 1997, the group released their first full-length album Hero The S.Z. The album included guest artists Nitro Microphone Underground and DJ Hazime. The song "空を取り戻した日 (Sora wo torimodoshita hi, Recover The Sky Of Day)" was featured during the end credits of "Session XX: Yose Atsume Blues" of the anime series Cowboy Bebop. The episode was only aired once in Japan and the song was never featured in any of the official Cowboy Bebop soundtracks.

In December 1998, Osumi would release his first solo album Control (The Spiritual Matters). Along with his Shakkazombie bandmates, the album featured production by DJ Watarai, Go Go King Recorders, and Dev Large of Buddha Brand with guest appearances by DJ Ohkubo, MACKA-CHIN of Nitro Microphone Underground, Keita "Cro-Ovi" Ishiguro of the hip-hop group Kimidori, Dejja, and Tina. Hide-Bowie, under his new moniker of Ignition Man, was featured on the song "Unsigned Hype" while Tsutchie produced "No Limit (Tsutchie Remix)".

In July 1999, the group released the EP Big Blue and their second album Journey Of Foresight. Released on July 23, Journey Of Foresight included guest appearances by Suiken, XBS, and Dabo of Nitro Microphone Underground, Lori Fine of the band COLDFEET, DJ/producer Illicit Tsuboi, and pianist Saiko Tsukamoto. The song "白いヤミの中 (Shiroi yami no naka, The White Darkness (Kimidori Break Version))" off the Big Blue EP, a remake of Kimidori's 1993 song of the same name, was known in the West after the track was used in a fan anime music video of Cowboy Bebop and Trigun for the 2001 Anime Expo entitled "Tainted Donuts". Osumi would later join Dev Large, Suiken & hip-hop duo Lunch Time Speax as the group God Inc and released the single "El Dorado Throw Down".

On February 23, 2000, the group released the compilation album S-Sence 2000 featuring several remixes by artists such as DJ Spinna, Master Low, Ropes, D.O.I., Japanese punk band Brahman, DJ Hazime, DJ Watarai, 4Hero, and Force of Nature.

On June 27, 2001, the group released the EP Get On Da Track. The mini album featured guest appearances by S-Word of Nitro Microphone Underground, emcee Nipps of Buddha Brand, and violinist/cellist Chieko Kinbara. The album also featured remixes of "カモフラ (Kamofura, Camouflage)" by American hip-hop producer Jay Dee a.k.a. J. Dilla of the hip-hop group Slum Village, "Right Here" by DJ Watarai, "First Tour" by DJ Takeshi Kubota of Kimidori, and "Get Yourself Arrested (W.E. In The U.S. Are In Trouble Mix)" by Tim Kinsella in a collaboration with Japanese rock band Northern Bright.

On March 27, 2002, the group released their third album The Goodfellaz. Along with appearances from members Suiken, Deli, and Dabo of Nitro Microphone Underground and DJ Hazime, the album featured appearances by P.H. Fron, Kashi Da Handsome, Lunch Time Speax, hip-hop group Gasboys, and singer Michico. This would be the group's last studio album. Osumi and Tsutchie pursued solo careers while Ignition Man made appearances on other projects before stepping away from music. Tsutchie released the solo albums Thanks For Listening in 2002 and This Is A Recording in 2003. Osumi released his second album Straight To Next Door with DJ Watarai and made guest appearances before taking a hiatus.

On June 25, 2015, Shakkazombie reformed and the group performed "大怪我 (Ookega, Serious Injury)" at "D.L Presents Hustlers Convention Night", a memorial event for late Buddha Brand member Dev Large.

On January 24, 2021, Osumi died at the age of 47, due to complications with sepsis.

== Other projects ==
In 1999, Osumi and Ignition Man started a men's fashion line named Swagger, originally promoting the brand via the Shakkazombie website and later expanding to several flagship retail stores in Tokyo, goods being sold in several cities outside of Japan, and an online presence with Japanese streetwear retail site ZOZOTOWN. Swagger included the SWG Black Platinum label as a subline and collaborated with brands such as The Timberland Company, The North Face, Nike, Inc., Ray-Ban, Schott NYC, New Era Cap Company and Levi Strauss & Co. In 2012, Swagger collaborated with famed American photographer Ricky Powell to create a capsule collection based on Powell's photos of hip-hop artists LL Cool J and The Beastie Boys. Swagger has also released collaborations with the Wu-Tang Clan and Nas.

Osumi would later start another line of men's apparel with a luxury emphasis named Phenomenon in 2004, which branched off into women's apparel. After filing for bankruptcy in 2013, Osumi ended the Phenomenon line in 2015. Osumi and design partner Yuichi Yoshii founded the men's clothing line MISTERGENTLEMAN in 2012 and became directors of the Tokyo-based record store WAVE at Roppongi Hills in 2017. Osumi was also the chief men's designer for Mash Holdings, which included the brands Gelato Pique and Snidel. In 2018, DJ and producer Shinichi Osawa a.k.a. Mondo Grosso would collaborate with Osumi for the song "One Temperature", Osumi's first work as an emcee in over ten years. Before his death, Osumi worked on his final collection, the Mistergentleman Fall Winter 2021-22 Collection, which will be presented by the brand in memory of his passing at Rakuten Fashion Week Tokyo in March 2021.

Before his hiatus from music, Ignition Man appeared on the track "Don't Be Gone" with Osumi on the album Ain't No Stoppin' The DJ by DJ Hazime. He was also featured on the tracks "Alcoholic Drive" and posse cut "Planet of The Bapes" on the albums Nigo (B)ape Sounds by Nigo, (B)ape Sounds Mixtape by DJ Kent of FORCE OF NATURE, and (B)Ape Sounds Mixtape [11Monkeys Liquidwebb Mix] by Cipha Sounds in 2004. The three albums were released by Ape Sounds Records, a subsidiary of Nigo's clothing brand A Bathing Ape. In 2012 and nine years after his retirement, Ignition Man would make a guest appearance on the song "The Sound Distillation" by Japanese rock band BACK DROP BOMB for their album The Ocracy. After the end of the SWAGGER line, Ignition Man founded the fashion brand KAKOI in May of 2017, specializing in hats and apparel.

In addition to his work with Shakkazombie, Tsutchie has done production work and remixes for other artists such as YOU THE ROCK★, ECD, Tomoe Shinohara, Dabo, Seagull Screaming Kiss Her Kiss Her, Kahimi Karie, Tokyo Ska Paradise Orchestra, Da Pump, Cymbals, Heartsdales, and Miliyah Kato. He has also worked on anime productions such as being part of the production team behind the music of Samurai Champloo, being a featured artist on the Samurai Champloo soundtrack albums, and creating the musical score & soundtrack album for Gangsta. Tsutchie has also been involved in a number of collaborative efforts with other artists and a notable example is the duo Ravolta (ラヴォルタ), consisting of Tsutchie handling the production and Aiha Higurashi of Seagull Screaming Kiss Her Kiss Her on vocals. Tsutchie was also involved in the collaborative project Suite Chic, which included Japanese R&B and hip-hop artists such as Namie Amuro, Ai, Dabo, Muro, Verbal of m-flo, and Zeebra. Ravolta's self-titled EP and their full-length album Sky, featuring a cover of the song "Faith" by George Michael, were both released only in Japan by Skylarkin Records in 1998. Suite Chic's When Pop Hits The Fan, which featured Tsutchie's production, was released in 2003. Tsutchie has also contributed to remix albums such as his remix "Pinocchio Classic and Vintage", featuring music from the Disney film Pinocchio, for the 2005 Japan only release Breaks & Beats Disney by Walt Disney Records. In 2011, Tsutchie started his own label SYNC TWICE featuring up and coming artists as well as his own music.

== Discography ==
=== Albums ===
- Hero The S.Z. (1997)
- Journey Of Foresight (1999)
- The Goodfellaz (2002)

=== Compilations ===
- S-Sense 2000 (2000)

=== EPs ===
- Big Blue (1999)
- Get On Da Track (2001)

=== Singles ===
- "Shakkattack" (1995)
- "手のひらを太陽に (Palms in the Sun)" (1996)
- "ブッダの休日" (Buddha no Kyūjitsu / Buddha's Holiday) (1997)
- "虹 / 共に行こう (Rainbow / Let's Go Together)" (1997)
- "SZ Burning / 64 Bars Relay" (1999)
- "Get Yourself Arrested" (2000)
- "共に行こう (DJ Hazime Remix) / 64 Bars Relay (DJ Watarai Street Remix)" (2000)
- "S.Z. Burning / It's Like That / 虹 /Kokoro Warp" (2000)
- "Kokoro Warp (4Hero Remixes)" (2000)
- "Warm Or Cold (Ropes Remix) / Big Blue (D.O.I. Remix)" (2000)
- "I Got Style (DJ Spinna Remix) / Wonder Worker (Force of Nature Remix)" (2000)
- "So Tight, So Deep" (2001)
- "First Tour" (2001)
- "What You Want?" (2002)
