= Koolmotor =

Studio album by Five Deez
- Released: November 27, 2001
- Studio: Dimensia Studios
- Genre: Hip hop
- Length: 67:07
- Label: Counterflow Recordings
- Producer: Fat Jon, Sonic

Five Deez chronology
| Koolmotor (2001) | Kinkynasti (2003) |

Professional ratings
Review scores
| Source | Rating |
|---|---|
| AllMusic | 4/5 stars |
| The Japan Times | favorable |

Koolmotor is the first studio album by American hip hop group Five Deez. It was released on Counterflow Recordings in 2001.

== Track listing ==
| No. | Title | Producer(s) | Length |
|---|---|---|---|
| 1. | "Say Intro" | Fat Jon | 2:12 |
| 2. | "Latitude" | Fat Jon | 4:13 |
| 3. | "Omni" | Sonic | 4:24 |
| 4. | "Got Dough" | Fat Jon | 5:30 |
| 5. | "Decapitated Orgasms" | Fat Jon | 5:17 |
| 6. | "Instruments of the Trade (The Word)" | Fat Jon | 4:37 |
| 7. | "Sexual for Elizabeth" (featuring Shing02) | Fat Jon | 5:17 |
| 8. | "Possibly" | Fat Jon | 4:57 |
| 9. | "B.E.A.T." | Fat Jon | 5:02 |
| 10. | "Ten" | Fat Jon | 4:04 |
| 11. | "Sugar" | Fat Jon | 5:11 |
| 12. | "Even" | Fat Jon | 2:47 |
| 13. | "Plasma Avenue" | Fat Jon | 3:59 |
| 14. | "Afghanistan Dan's Skating Stand" | Fat Jon | 9:37 |

== Personnel ==
- Fat Jon – vocals, production, turntable, keyboard, flute
- Pase – vocals, turntable, conga
- Kyle David – vocals
- Sonic – production
- Matt Anderson – upright bass
- Brian Olive – guitar
- Charles Cooper – saxophone
