= J. Rawls =

American hip-hop musician and educator (1974–

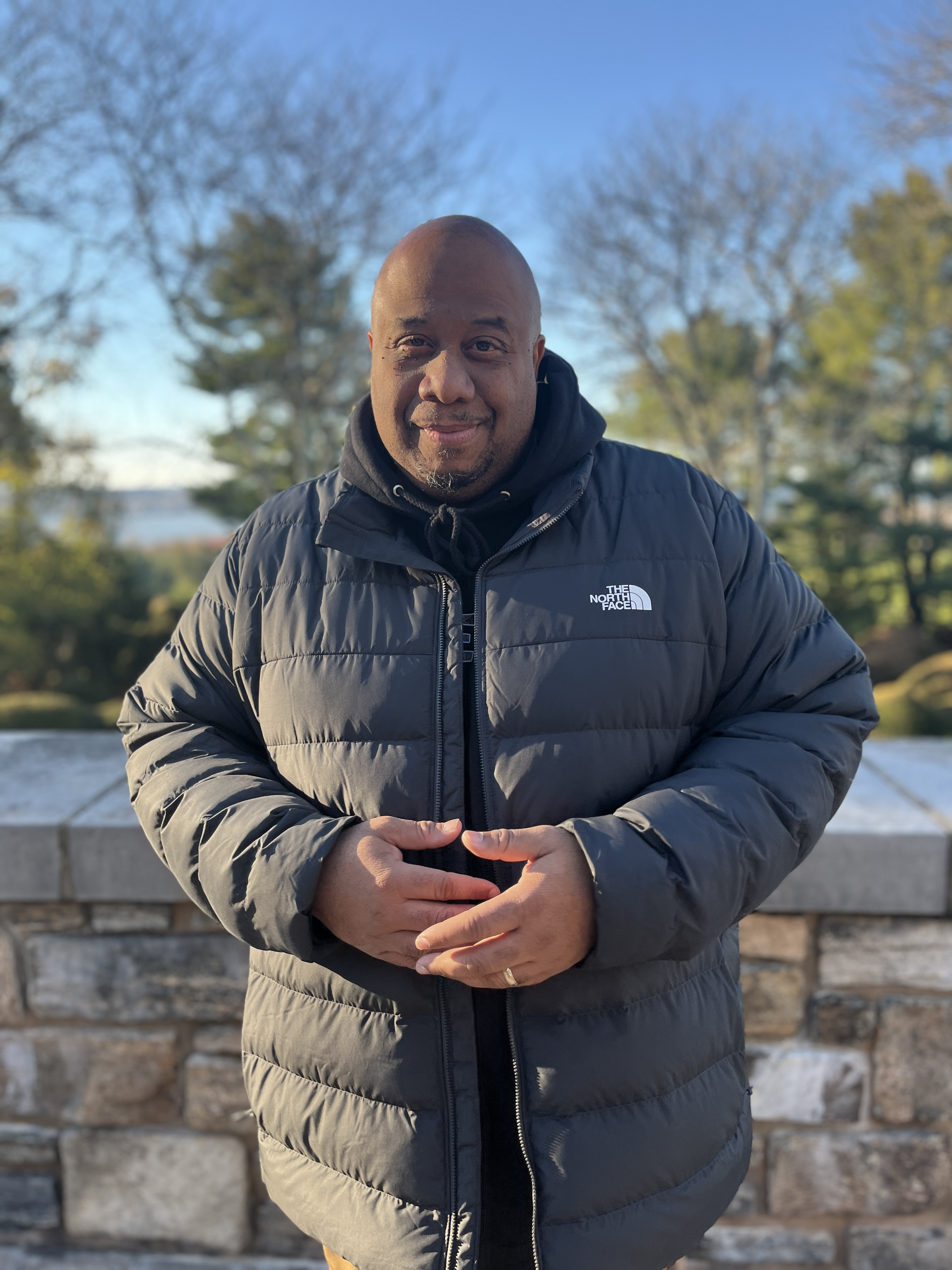
- J Rawls at Hip Hop Education Center Retreat, 2023

Background information
- Born: Jason Daniel Rawls; February 27, 1974 (age 52); Columbus, Ohio, U.S.
- Genre: Hip-hop
- Occupations: Record producer; DJ; rapper; educator
- Years active: 1998–present
- Label: Polar Entertainment
- Member of: Lone Catalysts; 3582
- Website: www.polarentllc.com

Jason Daniel Rawls (born February 27, 1974), known professionally as J. Rawls, is an American hip-hop musician, producer, DJ, educator, and speaker based in Columbus, Ohio. He emerged in the late 1990s underground hip-hop scene, contributing to projects such as Black Star's's debut album, Mos Def & Talib Kweli Are Black Star. He is the producer of the group Lone Catalysts with rapper J Sands. Rawls runs a Columbus-based production company and record label named Polar Entertainment, and performs as a DJ.

== Music career ==
Throughout his career, Rawls has developed a diverse body of work. His solo albums include The Essence of J. Rawls (2001), The Hip-Hop Affect (2011), and The Legacy (2014). He is a member of the duo 3582 with Fat Jon of Five Deez, and has collaborated on projects such as Respect Game or Expect Flames (2012) with Casual of Hieroglyphics and Youth Culture Power (2019) with John Robinson, a jazz-infused album addressing challenges in educating inner-city youth.

== Academic career ==
In addition to his musical career, Rawls has established an academic profile. He holds a bachelor's degree in business from the University of Cincinnati, a master's degree in education from Ashland University, and a Doctorate in Educational Administration from Ohio University. He has served as an adjunct instructor and visiting artist, teaching courses in hip-hop and music business, and has co-authored Youth Culture Power: A #HipHopEd Guide to Teacher-Student Relationships and Student Engagement. Rawls also directed the Hip-Hop OHIO Patton Education (HOPE) program at Ohio University's Patton College of Education. In 2023, he was hired by Ohio State University to help build one of the first collegiate level hip-hop minor programs in the United States.

== Discography ==
=== Studio albums ===
- The Essence of J. Rawls (2001)
- The Living Soul (2001) (with Fat Jon, as 3582)
- Hip Hop (2001) (with J Sands, as Lone Catalysts)
- Situational Ethics (2003) (with Fat Jon, as 3582)
- Histories Greatest Battles, Campaigns & Topics (2003)
- The Essence of Soul (2005)
- Good Music (2005) (with J Sands, as Lone Catalysts)
- The Liquid Crystal Project (2006)
- It's the Dank & Jammy Show (2007) (with Declaime)
- True Ohio Playas (2007) (with Count Bass D)
- J. Rawls Presents Holmskillit (2007) (with Holmskillit)
- Square Binizz (2007) (with J Sands, as Lone Catalysts)
- The Liquid Crystal Project 2 (2008)
- Rawls & Middle (2008) (with Middle Child)
- The 1960s Jazz Revolution Again (2009) (with John Robinson, as Jay Are)
- The Hip-Hop Affect (2011)
- Back To School (2011) (with J Sands, as Lone Catalysts)
- The Liquid Crystal Project 3 (2012)
- Respect Game or Expect Flames (2012) (with Casual)
- The Legacy (2014)
- Culture (2017) (with J Sands, as Lone Catalysts)
- #jazzhop (2022)
- The Confidence of Knowing (2024) (with Talib Kweli)

=== EPs ===
- Rawlzey (2015) (with Coolzey)
- The Profit (2019) (with Nova)
- Valor (2020) (with Eloh Kush)

=== Productions ===
- Mos Def & Talib Kweli - "Brown Skin Lady" and "Yo Yeah" from Mos Def & Talib Kweli Are Black Star (1998)
- Doseone - "Spitfire", "Self Explanatory", "That Ol' Pagan Shit", and "Genres" from Hemispheres (1998)
- Themselves - "Directions to My Special Place" from Them (2000)
- Rasco - "Living Voices" from Hostile Environment (2001)
- Moka Only - “String Beans (No Sunshine)” from Dirty Jazz (2005)
- El Da Sensei - "Lights, Camera, Action!" from The Unusual (2006)
- Capital Steez - "Infinity and Beyond" from AmeriKKKan Korruption (2012)
- MHz Legacy - "Columbus Diss Patch" from MHz Legacy (2012)
- Cas Metah & Wonder Brown - "Drowning Man" from The Darke Bros (2012)
