= Pole (album) =

Studio album by Pole
- Released: 2003
- Genre: Electronica
- Length: 43:04
- Label: Mute
- Producer: Stefan Betke

Pole chronology
R (2001)	Pole (2003)	Steingarten (2007)

Professional ratings
Aggregate scores
Source	Rating
Metacritic	66/100
Review scores
Source	Rating
AllMusic	2/5 stars
Alternative Press	4/5
Muzik	4/5 stars
Pitchfork	5.5/10

Pole is the fifth studio album by Pole. It was released by Mute Records in 2003. It features contributions from rapper Fat Jon, saxophonist Thomas Haas, and bassist August Engkilde.

== Critical reception ==
At Metacritic, which assigns a weighted average score out of 100 to reviews from mainstream critics, the album received an average score of 66% based on 17 reviews, indicating "generally favorable reviews".

Andy Kellman of AllMusic gave the album 2 stars out of 5, saying, "All glitches and sediments have been scrubbed off; the beats are straightened out and made prominent; the odd bit of instrumentation that was once implied or misshapen beyond recognition now actually exists." Andy Battaglia of The A.V. Club called it "a stylistic side-step that trips and falls without making much of the tumble."

== Track listing ==
No.	Title	Length
1.	"Slow Motion"	4:44
2.	"Bushes (There Is a Secret Behind)"	5:14
3.	"Umbrella (Version)"	4:45
4.	"Arena"	4:05
5.	"Round Two"	5:30
6.	"Like Rain (But Different)"	4:56
7.	"Green Is Not Green-Yellow (Version)"	4:35
8.	"The Bell"	4:30
9.	"Back Home"	4:45

== Personnel ==
Credits adapted from liner notes.

- Stefan Betke – composition, production, mastering
- Fat Jon – lyrics, vocals (1, 4, 5, 8)
- Thomas Haas – saxophone (2, 7)
- August Engkilde – upright bass (7, 9)
- Bianca Strauch – artwork
