= Lightweight Heavy =

Studio album by Fat Jon the Ample Soul Physician
- Released: October 23, 2002
- Genre: Hip hop Instrumental hip hop
- Length: 46:24
- Label: Dimid Recordings, Exceptional Records
- Producer: Fat Jon the Ample Soul Physician

Fat Jon the Ample Soul Physician chronology
Wave Motion (2001)	Lightweight Heavy (2002)	Afterthought (2004)

Singles from Lightweight Heavy
- 1. "Everywhere" Released: 2004; 2. "Talk to Me / Torn Again" Released: 2004

Professional ratings
Review scores
Source	Rating
AllMusic	4.5/5 stars
BBC Music	favorable
XLR8R	favorable

Lightweight Heavy is 2002 studio album by Fat Jon the Ample Soul Physician. It peaked at number 6 on CMJ's RPM chart.

== Critical reception ==
Matt Whalley of AllMusic gave the album 4.5 stars out of 5 and called it "a downtempo album with a unique style." He said, "Fat Jon uses all the elements of a generic downtempo album but does it with a deliberate style and to greater effect." Jon Freer of XLR8R said, "Lightweight Heavy merges the hopped-up swagger of blunted beats with ear-pleasing and beautiful melodies." He described it as "a commendable album full of slow-stepping, melody-rich cuts, steeped in instrumental hip-hop's teapot."

== Track listing ==
No.	Title	Length
1.	"Talk to Me"	3:45
2.	"Dreamers"	2:37
3.	"Day"	3:11
4.	"Everywhere"	3:22
5.	"Her"	3:38
6.	"Far Away"	3:14
7.	"Torn Again"	3:06
8.	"Mystery God"	3:22
9.	"Synopsis"	3:17
10.	"You Are"	3:10
11.	"Body Language"	3:29
12.	"Beyond Love"	3:53
13.	"Space Man"	3:23
14.	"Point A 2 B"	2:57
