= 2 (Pole album) =

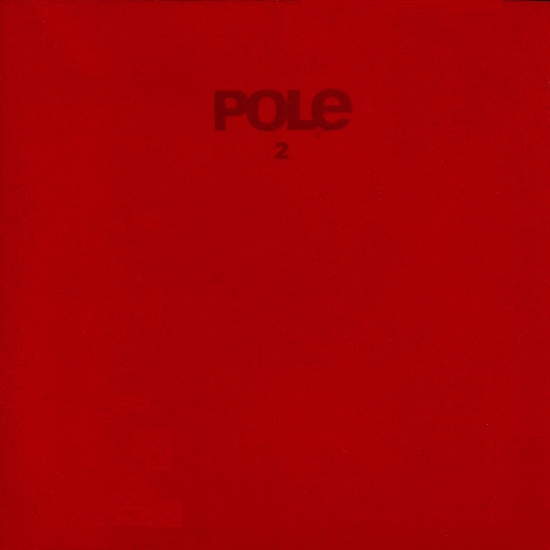

Studio album by Pole
- Released: 1999
- Genre: Dub techno
- Label: Kiff SM; Matador
- Producer: Stefan Betke

Pole chronology
1 (1998)	2 (1999)	3 (2000)

Professional ratings
Review scores
Source	Rating
AllMusic	3/5 stars
Entertainment Weekly	A−
Muzik	4/5 stars
NME	8/10
Pitchfork	7.2/10

2 is the second studio album by German electronic music producer Pole. It was released in 1999 by Kiff SM in Europe and Matador Records in the United States.

== Background ==
2 is the second in a trilogy of albums released annually between 1998 and 2000 by Pole. The trilogy has been noted for its use of heavy bass commonly found in dub music, and described as "ambient electronic minimalism". While some critics have noted that 2 is more dub-influenced than 1, Pole maintains that the influence was simply less hidden in 2, stating that "it was intended from the first record on, but it became more obvious on the second one and then on the third one."

The trilogy was also noted by critics for its conceptual monochromatic cover art, with 1 being blue, 2 being red, and 3 being yellow.

== Track listing ==
All tracks are written by Stefan Betke.

No.	Title	Length
1.	"Fahren"	7:16
2.	"Stadt"	2:52
3.	"Streit"	6:21
4.	"Huckepack"	5:56
5.	"Hafen"	5:12
6.	"Weit"	6:18
