= 24 Decembre =

EP by Pizzicato Five
- Released: November 22, 2000
- Genre: Shibuya-kei
- Length: 23:27
- Label: Readymade
- Producer: Yasuharu Konishi

Pizzicato Five chronology
Voyage à Tokyo (2000)	24 Decembre (2000)	Çà et là du Japon (2001)

24 Decembre (12月24日) is an EP by Japanese pop band Pizzicato Five, released on November 22, 2000 by Readymade Records.

== Track listing ==
All tracks are written by Yasuharu Konishi.

No.	Title	Length
1.	"24 Decembre" (12月24日)	4:36
2.	"Pizzicato Five X" (ピチカート・ファイブ・テン)	11:50
3.	"Un carnet de bal" (ディスコ手帖)	7:01
Total length:		23:27

== Charts ==
Chart (2000)	Peak position
Japan (Oricon)	67
