= Steingarten =

Studio album by Pole
- Released: March 2007
- Genre: Electronica
- Length: 45:06
- Label: ~scape
- Producer: Stefan Betke

Pole chronology
Pole (2003)	Steingarten (2007)	Wald (2015)

Professional ratings
Aggregate scores
Source	Rating
Metacritic	82/100
Review scores
Source	Rating
AllMusic	4/5 stars
Cokemachineglow	79%
Pitchfork	8.5/10
musicOMH	3/5 stars
PopMatters	8/10
Q	4/5 stars
Stylus	B+
Uncut	4/5 stars
URB	4/5 stars

Steingarten is the sixth studio album by Pole. It was released by his own label, ~scape, in 2007.

== Critical reception ==
At Metacritic, which assigns a weighted average score out of 100 to reviews from mainstream critics, the album received an average score of 82% based on 10 reviews, indicating "universal acclaim".

Tim O'Neil of PopMatters gave the album 8 stars out of 10, saying, "There's none of the indulgence that often bedevils minimalism, as the album clocks in at a modest 45 minutes." He added, "Every track is just about a complete microcosm unto itself, unfolding with precision and lingering for just long enough for the listener to begin to get a grasp of the many subtleties on display, but not long enough for it to wear out its welcome."

The Wire named it the 17th best album of 2007.

== Cover ==
The album cover shows a photograph of the Neuschwanstein Castle, In winter.

== Track listing ==
No.	Title	Length
1.	"Warum"	4:57
2.	"Winkelstreben"	5:04
3.	"Sylvenstein"	5:06
4.	"Schöner Land"	3:35
5.	"Mädchen"	5:37
6.	"Achterbahn"	4:55
7.	"Düsseldorf"	4:26
8.	"Jungs"	7:17
9.	"Pferd"	4:08
