= Pizzicato Five Remixis 2000 =

Pizzicato Five Remixes 2000

Remix album by Pizzicato Five
- Released: March 18, 2000
- Genre: Shibuya-kei
- Length: 35:53
- Label: Nippon Columbia

Pizzicato Five chronology
Pizzicato Five in the Bag (2000)	Pizzicato Five Remixes 2000 (2000)	Voyage à Tokyo EP (2000)

Professional ratings
Review scores
Source	Rating
Allmusic	link

Pizzicato Five Remixes 2000 is a 2000 Pizzicato Five remix album.

== Track listing ==
1. "The Groove Room Suite: a. Love Again / b. Darlin' Of Discotheque " - 9:11
2. "Roma (Corso Edit)" - 1:26
3. "Tout, Tout, Pour Ma Cherie (I [HEART] Kiss & Kids Mix)" - 3:20
4. "One, Two, Three, Four, Five, Six, Seven, Eight, Nine, Ten Barbie Dolls (Ken's Old Aiwa Mix)" - 6:25
5. "Darlin' Of Discotheque (Bongo A Go Go Mix)" - 5:35
6. "A Perfect World (A Night At Organ B. Mix)" - 4:40
7. "Jolly Bubbly Lovely (Cubis Tout-jour Mix)" - 5:12
