= MHz Legacy =

American hip-hop group

- Also known as: MHz
- Origin: Columbus, Ohio, U.S.
- Genres: Hip-hop
- Years active: 1997–present
- Labels: Fondle 'Em Records, Man Bites Dog Records
- Members: RJD2; Copywrite; Tage Future; Jakki Da Motamouth
- Past members: Camu Tao

MHz Legacy, formerly known as MHz, is an American hip-hop group from Columbus, Ohio. It consists of producer RJD2 and rappers Copywrite, Tage Future, and Jakki Da Motamouth. Camu Tao was also a member until his death in 2008. It was described by HipHopDX as "one of the city's most influential groups".

== History ==
In 1997, MHz was formed in Columbus, Ohio. In 1998, the group released the debut single, "World Premier", which would be later praised by Complex as "one of the best and most underrated 12" cuts from Fondle Em Records' impeccable catalog". Fact placed the single at number 95 on the "100 Best Indie Hip-Hop Records of All Time" list in 2015.

In 2001, MHz released a compilation album entitled Table Scraps, which was described by AllMusic as "one of the quintessential of the Cowtown releases".

In 2011, three years after the death of Camu Tao, MHz ended the hiatus and changed the name to MHz Legacy. The first studio album, MHz Legacy, was released on Man Bites Dog Records in 2012. It featured guest appearances from Danny Brown, Ill Bill, Slaine, Blu, and Slug. Production was handled by RJD2 as well as Harry Fraud, Marco Polo, and J. Rawls. Columbus Alive called it "a record that sounds distinctly like MHz, updated for 2012 without compromising the group's hardscrabble, battle-born identity".

== Discography ==
=== Studio albums ===
- MHz Legacy (2012)

=== Compilation albums ===
- Table Scraps (2001)

=== Singles ===
- "World Premier" (1998)
- "Rocket Science" (1999)

=== Guest appearances ===
- RJD2 - "Counseling" (2002)
- Copywrite - "Union Rights" from God Save the King (2012)
