= MHz Legacy (album) =

Studio album by MHz Legacy
- Released: October 30, 2012
- Genre: Hip hop
- Length: 65:45
- Label: Man Bites Dog Records
- Producer: Rob Stern; RJD2; Harry Fraud; Illmind; Stu Bangas; Surock; Marco Polo; J. Rawls; Jason Rose; D1

MHz Legacy chronology
Table Scraps (2001)	MHz Legacy (2012)

MHz Legacy is the first studio album by American hip hop group MHz Legacy. It was released on Man Bites Dog Records on October 30, 2012. It features guest appearances from Danny Brown, Ill Bill, Slaine, and Slug. Production is handled by the likes of Harry Fraud, Marco Polo, and J. Rawls.

Music videos were created for "Gone", "Somewhere", "Obituaries", "Outta Room", and "Satisfaction".

== Critical reception ==
Professional ratings
Aggregate scores
Source	Rating
Metacritic	81/100
Review scores
Source	Rating
Exclaim!	8/10
HipHopDX	3.5/5 stars
Okayplayer	favorable
XXL	XL

At Metacritic, which assigns a weighted average score out of 100 to reviews from mainstream critics, the album received an average score of 81, based on 4 reviews, indicating "universal acclaim".

Andres Tardio of HipHopDX wrote, "For now, MHz Legacy fits the group's journey quite well with strong highlights and a few struggles along the way." Nick McClure of Okayplayer stated, "Fans of quick-witted wordplay and hard beats will not be disappointed, even if they did wait a decade." Bogar Alonso of XXL commented that the album "sounds like the perfect counterbalance to the grit of Cannibal Ox's The Cold Vein (though with a few less gradients of genius)."

== Track listing ==
No.	Title	Producer(s)	Length
1.	"Accidentally on Purpose"	Rob Stern	2:45
2.	"Hindsight (1998)" (featuring Playdough)	RJD2	4:55
3.	"Four Player Mode"	RJD2	3:44
4.	"Outta Room"	RJD2	3:07
5.	"Spaceship" (featuring Danny Brown)	Harry Fraud	3:48
6.	"Soul Train (of Thought)" (featuring Oh No)	Illmind	3:47
7.	"Addictionary" (featuring Ill Bill and Slaine)	Stu Bangas	3:20
8.	"Gone"	Surock	3:46
9.	"Obituaries"	Marco Polo	3:32
10.	"Columbus Diss Patch" (featuring Dom)	J. Rawls	3:32
11.	"Mass Temple" (featuring Steve)	Jason Rose	3:54
12.	"Y'all Don't Know"	D1	4:33
13.	"Yellow and Blue" (featuring Blu)	Surock	4:16
14.	"Satisfaction" (featuring Slug)	RJD2	3:54
15.	"Tero Smith" (featuring Aaron Livingston)	RJD2	5:27
16.	"Somewhere (2099)"	RJD2	3:20
17.	"Mechanical Me" (featuring Jason Rose)	Jason Rose	4:03
Total length:			65:45
