= 3 (Pole album) =

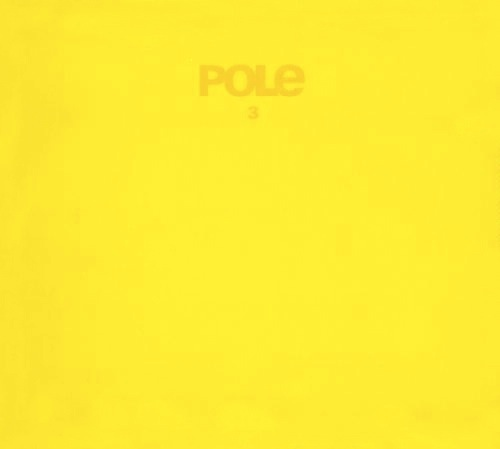

Studio album by Pole
- Released: 2000
- Genre: Dub techno
- Labels: Kiff SM; Matador
- Producer: Stefan Betke

Pole chronology
2 (1999)	3 (2000)	R (2001)

Professional ratings
Aggregate scores
Source	Rating
Metacritic	73/100
Review scores
Source	Rating
AllMusic	3.5/5 stars
Alternative Press	3/5
Mixmag	4/5 stars
Muzik	5/5
NME	8/10
Pitchfork	7.4/10
Spin	8/10

3 is the third studio album by German electronic music producer Pole. It was released by Kiff SM and Matador Records in 2000.

== Critical reception ==
3 was met with "generally favorable" reviews from critics. At Metacritic, which assigns a weighted average rating out of 100 to reviews from mainstream publications, this release received an average score of 73, based on 8 reviews.

== Track listing ==
All tracks are written by Stefan Betke.

No.	Title	Length
1.	"Silberfisch"	6:55
2.	"Taxi"	7:42
3.	"Karussell"	6:23
4.	"Uberfahrt"	7:25
5.	"Rondell Zwei"	7:12
6.	"Klettern"	7:29
7.	"Strand"	7:48
8.	"Fohlenfurz"	2:45
