= Voyage à Tokyo =

EP by Pizzicato Five
- Released: September 27, 2000
- Genre: Shibuya-kei
- Length: 14:12
- Label: Readymade
- Producer: Yasuharu Konishi

Pizzicato Five chronology
| Pizzicato Five Remixes 2000 (2000) | Voyage à Tokyo (2000) | 24 Decembre (2000) |

Voyage à Tokyo (東京の合唱) is an EP by Japanese pop band Pizzicato Five, released on September 27, 2000 by Readymade Records.

== Track listing ==
All music is composed by Yasuharu Konishi

| No. | Title | Lyrics | Length |
|---|---|---|---|
| 1. | "À Tokyo (At the Afternoon Café)" (東京の合唱～午後のカフェで) | Konishi; Yu Takemae | 5:09 |
| 2. | "Les Grandes Vacances" (夏休み) | | 3:51 |
| 3. | "À Tokyo (At the Nightclub)" (東京の合唱～ナイトクラブで) | Konishi | 5:12 |
| Total length: | | | 14:12 |

Notes

- "Les Grandes Vacances" is divided into the segments "Studio" (スタジオ), "Kamakura" (鎌倉) and "Enoshima" (江ノ島).

== Charts ==
| Chart (2000) | Peak position |
|---|---|
| Japan (Oricon) | 40 |
