= Styrofoam (musician) =

Belgian electronica music act

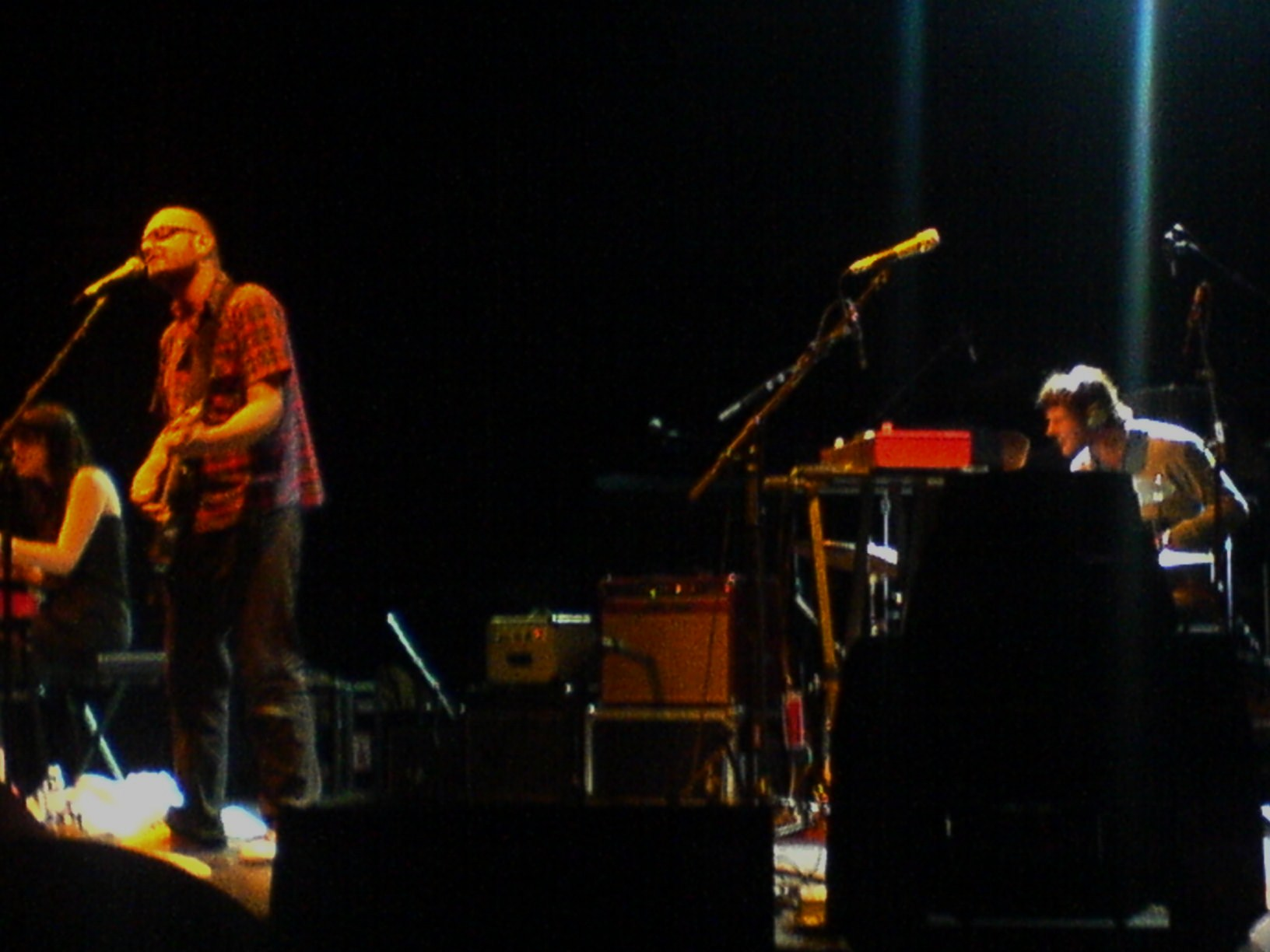
- Styrofoam performing in July 2008

Background information
- Born: Arne Van Petegem
- Origin: Belgium
- Genre: Indie rock / Electronica
- Years active: 2000–2012, 2016–current
- Labels: Morr Music, Nettwerk, Rocket Racer
- Website: Myspace.com/Styrofoam

Styrofoam (Arne Van Petegem, born 4 November 1973) is a Belgian one man glitch electronica project (indietronic) on the independent record label Morr Music.

== Discography ==
=== Releases ===
==== Albums ====
Year	Title	Label
2000	The Point Misser	Morr Music
2000	A Short Album About Murder	Morr Music
2003	I'm What's There To Show That Something's Missing	Morr Music
2004	Nothing's Lost	Morr Music
2006	The Same Channel [Joint album with Fat Jon]	Morr Music
2008	A Thousand Words	Nettwerk
2010	Disco Synthesizers & Daily Tranquilizers	
2018	We Can Never Go Home	sound in silence

==== EPs and singles ====
Year	Title	Label
2002	RR20	Rocket Racer
2002	Styrofoam/Dntel Split [7" Split]	Rocket Racer
2002	To Simply Lie Here And Breathe [7"]	Morr Music
2003	A Heart Without A Mind [EP]	Morr Music
2005	Live	Morr Music
2008	Bright Red Helmet	Nettwerk
2009	Other Side of Town	Nettwerk
2010	Get Smarter [EP]	
2016	three instrumental songs to celebrate the end of summer EP	Morr Music
