= A Thousand Words (album) =

Studio album by Styrofoam
- Released: 20 April 2008
- Genres: Indie rock, electronica
- Length: 44:53
- Label: Nettwerk
- Producer: Wax Ltd.

Styrofoam chronology
The Same Channel (2006)	A Thousand Words (2008)	Bright Red Helmet (2008)

A Thousand Words is the sixth album for artist Styrofoam a.k.a. Arne Van Petegem. It is also the first for label Nettwerk.

A Thousand Words eschews previous methods of what Styrofoam calls “bedroom producing” in favor of a fresh approach. Breaking the mold from previous Styrofoam albums, which were self-produced, A Thousand Words enlisted the guidance of Wax Ltd (Wally Gagel and Xandy Barry), a Los Angeles production team.

The album features a diverse yet cohesive array of guest vocalists, like Jim Adkins from Jimmy Eat World, Blake Hazard and Josh Rouse. Van Petegem has grown out of the, as he puts it, “shy electronic guy afraid of singing” to return to his roots singing in indie rock bands.

== Track listing ==
1. "After Sunset" – 3:40
2. "A Thousand Words" – 3:42
3. "My Next Mistake" [Ft. Jim Adkins] – 4:41
4. "No Happy Endings" [Ft. Erica Driscoll] – 4:09
5. "Microscope" [Ft. Blake Hazard] – 3:55
6. "Thirty to One" – 4:38
7. "Other Side of Town" – 4:20
8. "Lil White Boy" [Ft. Josh Rouse] – 4:03
9. "No Deliveries List" [Ft. Lili De La Mora] – 4:22
10. "Bright Red Helmet" – 4:13
11. "Final Offer" – 3:09

== Release history ==
Country	Date
United Kingdom	20 April 2008
United States	10 June 2008
