= 1 (Pole album) =

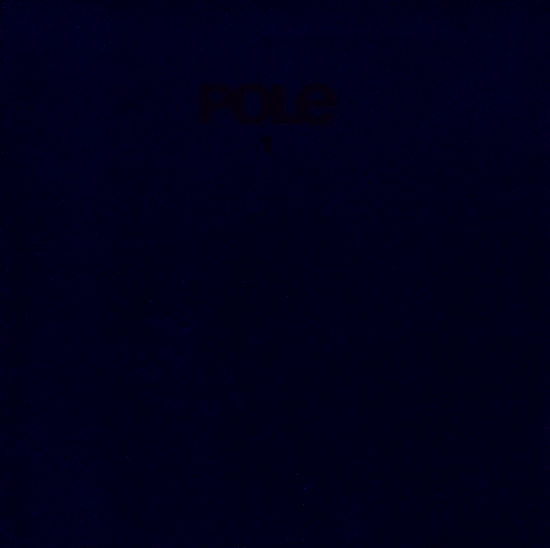

Studio album by Pole
- Released: 27 July 1998
- Genre: Dub techno; IDM; glitch
- Label: Kiff SM; Matador
- Producer: Stefan Betke

Pole chronology
1 (1998)	2 (1999)

1 is the debut studio album by German electronic music producer Pole. It was released by Kiff SM and Matador Records in 1998.

== Reception ==
Professional ratings
Review scores
Source	Rating
AllMusic	4/5 stars
Entertainment Weekly	B+
Muzik	5/5 stars
Pitchfork	5.7/10
Spin	8/10

Sean Cooper of AllMusic wrote that Pole's "nine variations on damaged dub minimalism recall the best of Basic Channel techno while steering well clear of the monotony factor", praising 1 as "an excellent debut". In 2017, Pitchfork placed 1 at number 34 on its list of "The 50 Best IDM Albums of All Time".

== Track listing ==
All tracks are written by Stefan Betke.

No.	Title	Length
1.	"Modul"	6:30
2.	"Fragen"	7:23
3.	"Kirschenessen"	5:23
4.	"Lachen"	12:18
5.	"Berlin"	3:57
6.	"Tanzen"	8:27
7.	"Fremd"	5:42
8.	"Paula"	6:19
9.	"Fliegen"	5:21

== Personnel ==
- Stefan Betke – production, writing
- Max Dax – art direction
