= Wave Motion (album) =

Studio album by Fat Jon the Ample Soul Physician
- Released: April 30, 2002
- Genre: Instrumental hip-hop
- Length: 39:34
- Label: Mush Records
- Producer: Fat Jon the Ample Soul Physician

Fat Jon the Ample Soul Physician chronology
Humanoid Erotica (2001)	Wave Motion (2002)	Lightweight Heavy (2004)

Professional ratings
Review scores
Source	Rating
AllMusic	4.5/5 stars
Billboard	favorable
CMJ New Music Report	favorable
Dusted Magazine	favorable
Pitchfork	8.2/10

Wave Motion is a 2002 studio album by Fat Jon the Ample Soul Physician. It consists of tracks from his two previously released EPs, Dyslexic and Stasis. It peaked at number 19 on CMJ's Hip-Hop chart.

== Critical reception ==
Martin Woodside of AllMusic gave the album 4.5 stars out of 5, describing it as "a mellow, moody instrumental collection comprised of sleepy soul and down-tempo funk." He said, "The beats are crisp but light, and the vibe is extremely laid-back." Paul Cooper of Pitchfork gave the album an 8.2 out of 10, saying, "Fat Jon is a conscientious and gifted producer with a talent for creating tracks that work on multiple levels simultaneously. He said, "Wave Motion isn't an accessory or an alternative like so many instrumental albums; Wave Motion is a serious proposition and a statement not only of Fat Jon's studio abilities but also of his introspective aesthetic."

== Track listing ==
No.	Title	Length
1.	"Where?"	3:41
2.	"Feel the Void"	3:21
3.	"Visual Music"	3:29
4.	"Watch Out"	4:08
5.	"For Stress"	3:24
6.	"1975"	1:20
7.	"Eyes"	3:58
8.	"Wet Secrets"	4:01
9.	"Depths"	3:18
10.	"Automated Life Machines"	3:43
11.	"Surrection"	4:02
12.	"Disgust"	1:09
13.	"Trust You" (Japanese edition bonus track)	3:29
14.	"Rain Dance (Instrumental Mix)" (Japanese edition bonus track)	7:36
