= Midicronica =

Japanese rap group

Midicronica is a Japanese musical rap group. The band consists of four members known as "#894", "#181", "#716" and "#563" . The band has collaborated with many other artists such as Shin-ski of Martiangang, Sonomi, Gumuna, La Melomania etc. The members draw themselves as small characters who appear on the album covers and additional artwork. The group has strong influences from the pop-rock band Sugar Ray.

The group's song "San Francisco" from their album #501 was used as the ending theme to the last episode of the 2004-2005 anime Samurai Champloo.

== Albums ==
- #101 (2018)
- #777 (2015)
- #303 (2013)
- color (2012)
- Happy Birth Death (2011)
- 403 forbidden 寅 (2010)
- .Co. Lab (2009)
- #209 (2008)
- #501 (2005)
