= 1000-Word Philosophy =

1000-Word Philosophy: An Introductory Anthology
- Website type: Philosophy anthology
- Available in: English
- Headquarters: Boulder, Colorado
- Editor: Nathan Nobis
- Website: 1000wordphilosophy.com
- Commercial: No.
- Launched: January 20, 2014; 12 years ago
- Current status: Online

1000-Word Philosophy is an online philosophy anthology that publishes introductory 1000-word (or less) essays on philosophical topics. The project was created in 2014 by Andrew D. Chapman, a philosophy lecturer at the University of Colorado, Boulder. Since 2018, the anthology's editor-in-chief is Nathan Nobis, a professor of philosophy at Morehouse College. Many of the initial authors are graduates of the University of Colorado at Boulder's Ph.D. program in philosophy; now the contributors are from all over the globe. The essays include references or sources for more discussion of the essay's topic.

== See also ==
- The Stone (blog)
