= Pole (musician) =

German electronic musician

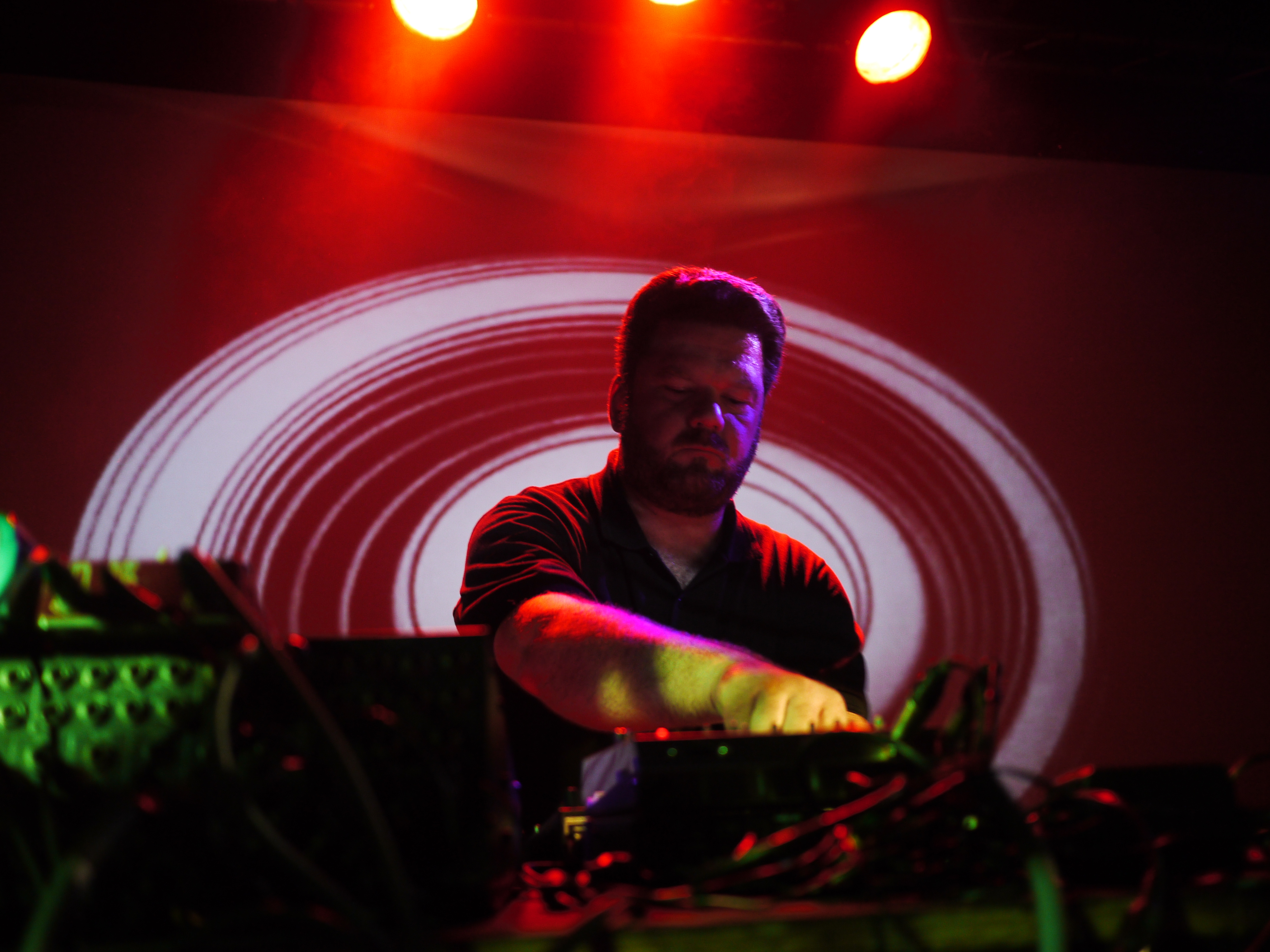
- Pole performing live in 2011

Background information
- Born: Stefan Betke; 18 February 1967 (age 59)
- Origin: Düsseldorf, Germany
- Genres: Electronica; experimental; dub techno; glitch; IDM; ambient
- Occupations: Electronic musician; producer; remixer
- Years active: 1998–present
- Labels: Mute, Matador
- Website: pole-music.com

Pole is the stage name of Stefan Betke (born 18 February 1967), a German electronic musician and record producer commonly associated with the glitch genre as well as dub techno.

== Biography ==
Betke was born in Düsseldorf on February 18, 1967. In 1996, while pursuing DJing and electronic music production, he began to draw inspiration from a Waldorf 4-Pole resonant filter which he had accidentally broken, and derived the alias Pole from the filter. His first four albums, titled 1 (1998), 2 (1999), 3 (2000), and R (2001), an intentional trilogy of albums followed by a collection of remixes of Pole's 1998 debut EP Raum, were based around his production style of incorporating the glitching analog output of the filter into minimal, textural tracks usually taking the form of dub basslines and rhythms with percussion provided by the eponymous filter. In 2003 Betke departed from this style for the self-titled album Pole (a combination of tracks from two EPs, "45/45" and "90/90"), which utilized more traditionally electronic but still eclectic production.

Pole's music has been distributed on several different labels, including Matador Records and Mute Records. In 1999 Betke cofounded (with Barbara Preisinger) the label ~scape, also known for publishing Jan Jelinek; Kiff SM and ~scape released the Pole box set 1 2 3 in 2008. On September 1, 2011, Betke founded a new artist label named Pole.

Betke mastered John Frusciante's 2016 EP Foregrow and Oneohtrix Point Never's 2025 album Tranquilizer, and oversaw the 2019 re-master of Alphaville's albums Forever Young, Afternoons in Utopia and The Breathtaking Blue alongside Bernhard Lloyd.

== Discography ==
=== Albums ===
- 1 (1998)
- 2 (1999)
- 3 (2000)
- R (2001)
- Pole (2003)
- Steingarten (2007)
- Wald (2015)
- Fading (2020)
- Tempus (2022)

=== Singles ===
- Waldgeschichten (2011)
- Waldgeschichten 2 (2011)
- Waldgeschichten 3 (2012)
