= Samurai Champloo =

Japanese anime television series

- Key art depicting (left to right) Jin, Mugen, and Fuu

サムライチャンプルー (Samurai Chanpurū)
- Genre: Adventure; Historical; Samurai
- Created by: Manglobe
- Manga
- Written by: Masaru Gotsubo
- Published by: Kadokawa Shoten
- English publisher: AUS: Madman Entertainment; NA: Tokyopop
- Magazine: Monthly Shōnen Ace
- Original run: January 26, 2004 – September 25, 2004
- Volumes: 2
- Anime television series
- Directed by: Shinichirō Watanabe
- Produced by: Takatoshi Hamano; Takashi Kochiyama; Tetsuro Satomi
- Written by: Shinji Obara
- Music by: Tsutchie; Fat Jon; Nujabes; Force of Nature
- Studio: Manglobe
- Licensed by: Crunchyroll (Note: In North America through Crunchyroll (formerly known as Funimation) and in Australia through Madman Anime.); SEA: Odex; UK: MVM Films
- Original network: Fuji TV
- English network: AU: SBS TV; CA: Razer (Kamikaze); IN: Animax; SEA: Animax Asia; UK: Viceland; US: Funimation Channel, Adult Swim (Toonami); ZA: Animax
- Original run: May 20, 2004 – March 19, 2005
- Episodes: 26
- icon

Samurai Champloo (Japanese: サムライチャンプルー, Hepburn: Samurai Chanpurū) is a Japanese anime television series. The debut television production of studio Manglobe, the 26-episode series aired from May 2004 to March 2005. It was first partially broadcast on Fuji TV, then had a complete airing on Fuji Network System. It was licensed for North American broadcast on Adult Swim, and for commercial release first by Geneon Entertainment and later by Crunchyroll. It was also licensed for English releases in the United Kingdom by MVM Films, and in Australia and New Zealand by Madman Entertainment. A manga adaptation was serialized in Monthly Shōnen Ace during 2004, later released in North America by Tokyopop the following year.

The series is set in a fictionalized version of Edo period Japan, blending traditional elements with anachronistic cultural references, including hip hop. The series follows the exploits of tea waitress Fuu, vagrant outlaw Mugen, and ronin Jin. Fuu saves Mugen and Jin from execution, then forces the pair to aid in her quest to find a samurai who smells of sunflowers. Structured similarly to a road movie, the series focuses on tolerance and acceptance of minorities contrasted against its setting, with a central theme being the portrayal and acceptance of death.

Director Shinichirō Watanabe began planning for the series in 1999, creating the characters and premise during his work on Cowboy Bebop: The Movie and The Animatrix, and began pre-production in 2002. The staff included character designer and animation director Kazuto Nakazawa and writers Shinji Obara and Yukihiko Tsutsumi of Office Crescendo. The music was composed by hip hop artists Shinji "Tsutchie" Tsuchida of Shakkazombie, Fat Jon, Nujabes and Force of Nature. The production was unstructured, with the scenario going through multiple revisions, and Watanabe bringing in multiple guest creators to ensure a high animation quality. Reception of the series has been positive, with praise focusing on its animation and music, and proved a commercial success in the West.

== Plot ==
Samurai Champloo opens in a small town where Fuu, working as a tea waitress, is harassed by the son of the town's corrupt prefect. The outlaw Mugen arrives in town, and Fuu begs him for protection, which he gives in exchange for food. Meanwhile, the ronin Jin, also a new arrival, kills the prefect's bodyguards when they abuse a peasant, ending up in conflict with Mugen when the latter mistakes him for one of the prefect's men. Mugen and Jin fight, destroying the tea house. The pair are captured and sentenced to death, but Fuu saves them. The pair attempt to restart their battle, but Fuu tosses a coin, saying if it lands on heads then the pair can continue their battle, but if it lands on tails they postpone their battle to help her find a samurai who smells of sunflowers, whom she has sought for years. She wins the toss, and they embark on a series of adventures alongside Fuu's quest.

During the closing stories, the three finally arrive at the town of Ikitsuki, with each ending up in conflict with a group of assassins sent by the government to kill the "sunflower samurai", Seizo Kasumi—Fuu's father. Fuu finds Kasumi, seeking revenge for Kasumi abandoning Fuu and her mother, but she relents as he is already dying from an illness. One of the assassins kills Kasumi before he is defeated by Jin. Mugen and Jin then have their duel, their swords shattering, but choose not to kill each other as they now consider each other friends. Fuu learns her father played a part in the Shimabara Rebellion and went away to protect her. Fuu also reveals she lied about the coin toss result, which briefly annoys Mugen and Jin. Recovered from their final fight, the three part ways grateful for their shared adventure.

== Setting and themes ==
Series director Shinichirō Watanabe defined the central theme of Samurai Champloo as the portrayal and acceptance around death, themes he had previously explored in his science fiction series Macross Plus (1994) and Cowboy Bebop (1998). Another theme outlined in the series pitch was individuality and finding one's unique identity. The series is set in Edo period Japan, roughly sixty years after the end of the Sengoku period. While a historical time period, the anime does not focus on historical detail beyond minor inclusions and references, mainly using contemporary-style dialogue and behavior. A conscious inclusion was emphasising cultural acceptance and tolerance of minorities including the indigenous Ainu people, foreigners, LGBT people, and Christians; the historical Edo period was a time when Japan was highly structured, conformist and isolationist. Due to its Edo setting and incorporation of samurai culture and honor codes, Watanabe was worried the anime would be seen as nationalistic in tone, prompting its focus on minorities and tolerance. Watanabe put in as much as he could manage of these themes and subjects, challenging earlier limitations imposed by a lack of historical information from the time and Japanese television codes restricting the portrayal of Japanese minorities in the period.

The main cultural influence on the anime is the music and associated subculture of hip hop. Watanabe had been a fan of hip hop music from his high school years, citing his first exposure as "The Message" by Grandmaster Flash and the Furious Five. He compared the samurai culture to hip hop through a similar philosophy of self-identity. The use of hip hop also reinforced the series' focus on its minority and counter-cultural cast, creating a cultural reference by using one with the other. Alongside his liking of hip hop, Watanabe attributed a large amount of the series' inspiration in the works of actor Shintaro Katsu, particularly his historical dramas. The narrative approach of the finished series was inspired by Katsu's notorious habit of directing projects without a set story structure. The word "Champloo" in the title was derived from the Okinawan term chanpurū, with Watanabe comparing the blending of elements in the anime with the meaning of chanpurū. The food depicted in the show was originally accurate to the Edo period, but eventually expanded to include anachronistic dishes such as okonomiyaki.

The plot is structured like a road movie, with little connection between stories until the final three-part arc, contrasting against the serial structure of its contemporaries. Watanabe particularly cited the movies about the blind samurai Zatoichi as an inspiration for this style. Other influences on the series included Enter the Dragon and Dirty Harry. One episode was based around the Chinese concept of Qi. During early planning, the series' tone was far more serious, but after the first four episodes had been written, the staff were worried about the tone becoming bleak, prompting a greater focus on comedy. Several episodes incorporate references, homages, and parodies of popular media. The Japanese episode titles use four-character idioms referencing the theme of that episode's story. They drew from multiple sources, including Japanese and Western sayings (the first episode's title, "Shippu Doto", is a Japanese rendering of the German saying "Sturm und Drang"), philosophical concepts ("Inga Oho" references a proverb about the workings of karma), and pieces of classic media (the episode title "Anya Koro" references Naoya Shiga's novel of the same name). The English episode titles were created by translator Ryan Morris. Morris did not directly translate the Japanese titles, instead using alliteration to preserve the rhythm and meaning.

=== Characters ===
The series follows the exploits of the three leads−Fuu, Mugen, and Jin−when they are drawn together by circumstance and end up traveling together to find the sunflower samurai. The main cast was created by Watanabe, who wanted a cast of heroes who were silly, immature, and dangerous, with "a touch of insanity". He described Mugen and Jin as unconventional people not bound by the rules of the period. The characters were designed by Kazuto Nakazawa, who had worked as both an artist and director on multiple projects including Ashita no Nadja and the anime segments of Kill Bill: Volume 1. The early character drafts were more to Nakazawa's tastes than the wishes of the production team, resulting in numerous redrafts based on requests. The voice recording included sessions with all three leads together, which caused occasional tensions due to their different work backgrounds.

- Mugen (無限(ムゲン)) is a vagrant outlaw from the Ryukyu Islands who uses self-taught sword techniques. Having lived a harsh and solitary life since childhood, he has a deep mistrust and disdain of authority and lives to fight strong opponents. Watanabe thought of Mugen as young and "a little stupid", putting him in stark contrast with Cowboy Bebop protagonist Spike Spiegel. He also described Mugen as symbolizing "a rapper's ideal" of self-expression. Mugen's Ryukyuen origins formed part of Watanabe's focus on inclusivity and tolerance within the narrative. He is voiced in Japanese by Kazuya Nakai. His performance changed little from the audition, someone on the edge who did not follow rules. His performance reportedly improved during the soundchecks, which had a more relaxed atmosphere and emphasis on timing. In English, Mugen is voiced by Steve Blum.
- Jin (仁(ジン)) is Mugen's antithesis, a calm and stoic ronin wandering Japan after being forced to kill his master and consequently wearing glasses to disguise himself. He is the best at sensing danger, and prone to risking his life to prove his worth. He is a master of mujushinken, a style of kenjutsu created in the early Edo period by Harigaya Sekiun. Jin was created as a foil for Mugen to stop the story from becoming one-dimensional. A scrapped idea of Watanabe's was for Jin to be an anarchist, but otherwise his personality and design changed little during production. He is voiced in Japanese by Ginpei Sato, at the time a stage actor who had not done voice roles previously after failing auditions for two other projects; his failed audition for Wolf's Rain prompted a staff member to recommend him to Watanabe. He had to learn about voice acting on the job, including timing and getting into character, and during recording for later episodes got into trouble due to wanting to shift his portrayal of the character. In English, Jin is voiced by Kirk Thornton.
- Fuu (風(フウ)) is the one who brings Mugen and Jin together to help her. She is a cheerful and spirited young woman and a jack-of-all-trades due to her constant changing between part-time jobs, starting the series working as a tea waitress; she has a pet flying squirrel called Momo. A recurring gag is Fuu temporarily becoming fat after eating a lot, due to her being a big eater. Out of the three characters, Fuu's personality changed the least from Watanabe's original series concept, though her character design underwent major revisions to become more conventionally beautiful. She is voiced in Japanese by Ayako Kawasumi. Compared to her other roles, Kawasumi was asked not to overact her effort sounds outside scenes where her character was very expressive, making her more realistic. It was the first time she did not create a separate internal character to voice Fuu, being asked to be herself as far as possible. Her favorite episode was "Stranger Searching" when the fat Fuu first appeared, as she found voicing this version a challenge. In English, Fuu is voiced by Kari Wahlgren.

In the original plan, there were three semi-regular characters that would appear through the series. They were Rekku, a Dutchman claiming to be Japanese; Koku, a traveling priest acquainted with Jin's past; and Sara, a female ninja who falls in love with Mugen. While their roles were reduced to one-off appearances, versions of the characters survived. Rekku became the character Joji in "Stranger Searching", the priest appeared in "Lethal Lunacy", while Sara was a central character in "Elegy of Entrapment". An early antagonist is Ryujiro, the son of a corrupt government official who loses his arm to Mugen in the opening episode and later plots revenge against them. Historical figures or character homages also appear, for example painter Hishikawa Moronobu; Joji, who is a fictionalized version of Isaac Titsingh; a version of American baseball player Alexander Cartwright; and Ando Uohori, who is a direct reference to Andy Warhol.

== Production ==
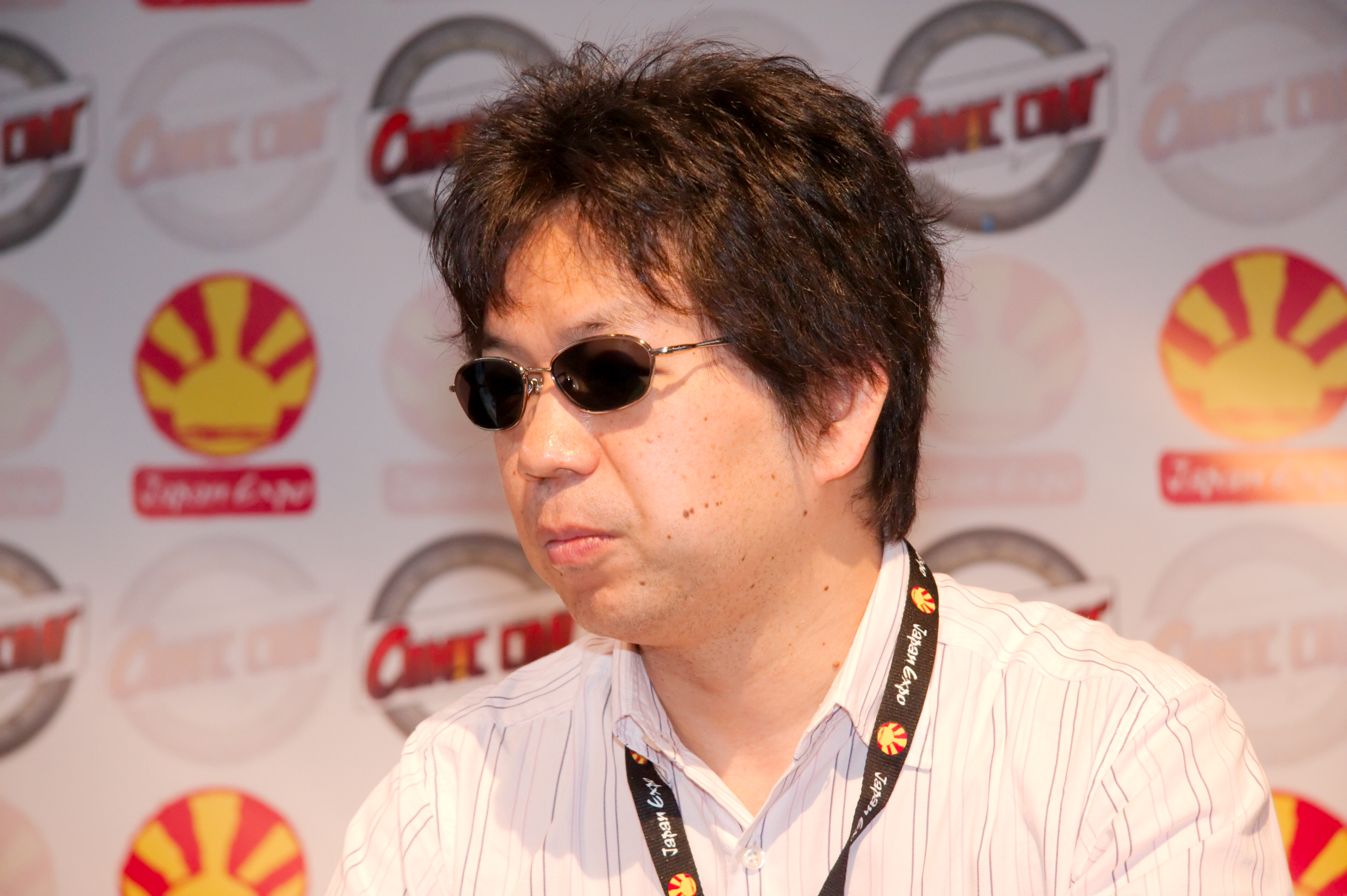
Series director Shinichirō Watanabe at the 2009 Japan Expo

Samurai Champloo was the debut television production of animation studio Manglobe, which was started in 2002 by Sunrise veteran Shinichirō Kobayashi. The opening animation was contributed to by the studio Madhouse. A production committee to support the project was formed by Victor Entertainment's Shirō Sasaki, partnering with Tokuma Shoten and North American company Geneon Entertainment. Watanabe acted as the series director, in addition to creating the project. Kobayashi, Sasaki, Sanae Mitsugi and Hideki Goto were credited as planners and executive producers, and the producers were Takatoshi Hamano, Takashi Kochiyama and Tetsuro Satomi.

The story was composed by Shinji Obara and Yukihiko Tsutsumi of Office Crescendo, with scripts written by Obara, Dai Satō, Touko Machida, Keiko Nobumoto, Seiko Takagi, Ryota Sugi, and Watanabe. Nakazawa wrote and storyboarded episode 15, being credited as Uwadan Shimofuwato in the former role. Nakazawa also acted as both character designer and chief animation director. The art director was Takeshi Waki, the storyboard director was Kazuki Akane, and coloring was led by Eri Suzuki. Additional characters were created by Hideto Komori. Weapon designs were co-created by Mahiro Maeda and Manglobe managing director Hidero Okamoto. The cinematographer was Kazuhiro Yamada, with Syuichi Kakesu as lead editor. Numerous guest creators were also brought in for different episodes as artists or animation directors, including Shūkō Murase Takeshi Yoshimoto, Naoko Nakamoto, Hiroyuki Imaishi and Tensai Okamura.

=== Concept and development ===
The concept for Samurai Champloo was created by Watanabe in 1999, then known for his work on Cowboy Bebop. He wanted to create a series antithetical to the largely calm and mature atmosphere of Cowboy Bebop, wanting a complete change due to fatigue after working on one project for such a long period. The success of Cowboy Bebop meant he was permitted to develop whatever he wanted for his next project. As with his other projects, he drew inspiration from music, then matched a narrative to it. His approach was combining two of his favorite things, classic samurai adventure films and series and hip hop music, into a single work. He created the concept for Samurai Champloo during this period, but work on it was delayed due to his work on Cowboy Bebop: The Movie and his segments of The Animatrix at Studio 4°C. Kobayashi had invited Watanabe to work on an original project at Manglobe when it was founded in February 2002, and Watanabe sent the Samurai Champloo pitch in May of that year. The pitch included the central concepts for the series, and draft designs for the lead characters. Watanabe invited Nakazawa on board as he was a fan of his work and wanted the opportunity to work with him. Obara, known more for his work on live-action movies and television dramas, was brought in through a mutual friend at Office Crescendo.

The eventual unstructured production style was unheard of in anime, and at the outset Obara created a series structure. The three-episode finale was not planned ahead, emerging naturally as part of the design approach. As the project evolved, Watanabe pushed for this structured approach to be discarded aside from the lead characters and premise, and Obara agreed to the new approach. The lack of a structure meant that the series narrative was constructed piece by piece, with few plot details being decided in advance. The fates of the three characters were also undecided during this stage. Watanabe originally planned for all three to survive, but at one point the team considered Jin and Mugen dying respectively in the final two episodes. Even the identity of the sunflower samurai was unknown to Watanabe during the early stages. Due to this approach, pre-production on the series lasted a year. Watanabe had a great deal of creative control and input, including on music selection and editing.

The first episode took a long time to polish, being completed around the beginning of 2004, but it and subsequent episodes had an animation quality higher than other series of the time. This was attributed to the working environment of Manglobe allowing for easy communication between staff members, and Watanabe's passion for the project prompting famous staff from other notable anime projects to come on board. The non-standard style of production left some members of staff including Sasaki skeptical that the series would be finished. For the sound mixing, Watanabe wanted the same approach and quality as Cowboy Bebop: The Movie, bringing in sound engineer Masashi Yabuhara who had worked with Yoko Kanno on the sound design of Cowboy Bebop. The fight scenes were choreographed to appear more realistic than other period dramas, which featured a clashing of swords which in reality would chip them. Unique eyecatch artwork was created for each episode based on its themes and content. Woodblock prints portraying the characters, designed by former shojo manga creator Tsubaki Anna, were shown at various points through the series. Nakazawa created the illustration use for sponsor announcements.

=== Scenario and art design ===
Samurai Champloo was Obara's first time working on an anime series, and Watanabe attributed him with bringing a new style of narrative and pacing to the series. Sato had worked with Watanabe before on Macross Plus. He described the process of discussing plot concepts with Watanabe and building upon voiced ideas, treating his own contributions like sample discs that might be accepted or rejected. The script meetings were unusually long, beginning with the synopsis and ending up with the final form, alongside off-topic conversation that was sometimes incorporated into that episode's plot. Due to Watanabe's reputation and the success of his projects in the West, the anime was created with a Western audience in mind with the expectation that it would be more successful outside Japan. This resulted in more overt references to Western culture being included. An assassin character who appeared in the second episode was intended to appear during the finale, but he was cut due to time constraints and a general lack of people remembering his earlier appearance.

Nakazawa had trouble getting a feel for the characters, with Mugen's design still going through adjustments when production on the first episode began. For the animation of Mugen's fighting style, the team used gymnastic footage as a reference alongside incorporating breakdancing moves. For Jin, Nakazawa "ignored all of the conventions" for sword fighting and kept his fighting style inconsistent throughout the series, basing his reactions and tactics on combat sports. He broke animation conventions to make these techniques work, confusing the animation team. For his work as art director after joining during production of the first episode, Waki was instructed to create extremes of light and darkness in scenes, creating a realistic impression of the period when artificial light sources were scarce and expensive. The variety and more contemporary elements prevented Waki from growing bored with the Edo setting. The approach to the animation, lacking an overarching plan, was described as a reflection of the lead characters' non-conformist personalities.

Nakazawa designed the men's kimono to resemble contemporary jackets, incorporating homages to sports designs such as Adidas and Puma. Many secondary characters were designed based on both the series' voice actors and staff members. During the production of the second half of the series, it became increasingly difficult for Nakazawa to design all guest characters, resulting in Komori being brought in. Due to most of these characters being older men, when the early plan was for a young cast with several female characters, Komori felt disappointed by his workload. Maeda was brought on for weapon designs when the plan was to have strong antagonists with unique weapons for each episode, but the plan never came about, and when Maeda moved to working on Gankutsuou: The Count of Monte Cristo, the design work shifted to Okamoto. The incorporation of graffiti was suggested by Sato to further enhance the hip hop aesthetic and tone. He also suggested the inclusion of references to Warhol and Jean-Michel Basquiat.

=== Music ===
The music for Samurai Champloo was collaboratively composed by Shinji "Tsutchie" Tsuchida of Shakkazombie, Fat Jon, Nujabes and Force of Nature. All were artists from the hip hop music genre, with Tsutchie being a friend of Watanabe. A number of guest artists contributed to different episodes. The opening theme "Battlecry" was composed by Nujabes, with Shing02 singing and writing the lyrics. The ending themes were created by Minmi, Kazami, and Azuma Riki. The final episode's ending theme was "San Francisco", licensed from the rapper band Midicronica.

The Music of Samurai Champloo was released across four CDs during 2004 by Victor Entertainment under their JVC label. The first two, "Masta" and "Departure", were released on June 23. "Departure" focuses on tracks by Nujabes and Fat Jon alongside Minmi's main ending theme, while "Masta" includes work from FORCE OF NATURE and Tsutchie including "You". The next two, "Playlist" and "Impression", were released on September 22. "Playlist" was dedicated entirely to work by Tsutchie, including "Fly". "Impression" bundles tracks by Nujabes, Fat Jon and Force of Nature, alongside the theme "Who's Theme".

== Release ==
=== Broadcast ===
Samurai Champloo was first revealed through a magazine spread in the September 2003 issue of Newtype, and it premiered on Fuji TV on May 20, 2004. The series ran for seventeen episodes on the network until September 23, 2004, when they decided to cancel its broadcast. The series resumed airing on Fuji Network System, referred to as a second season, during the channel's midnight slot; the remaining 18th–26th episodes aired from January 22 to March 19, 2005.

The original North American licensee was Geneon Entertainment and its parent company Pioneer Entertainment, licensing the anime a year before its Japanese broadcast. The dub was handled by Bang Zoom! Entertainment, with company president Eric Sherman remembering it as one of his favorite projects. In a later interview, Jin's voice actor, Kirk Thornton, described the dubbing as a rare project where the actors were able to have a greater freedom in their performances, not having to match the Japanese original. It was broadcast in North America on Adult Swim during its late night slot, starting on May 14, 2005. Starting with Episode 22 on February 3, 2007, episodes were streamed through Adult Swim's online Friday Night Fix channel. It saw subsequent North American broadcasts on Funimation Channel starting March 21, 2011; the series re-aired on Adult Swim through its Toonami programming block replacing Michiko & Hatchin starting on January 2, 2016.

Samurai Champloo debuted in Canada on December 24, 2006, on the digital station Razer. In Australia, the first thirteen episodes were broadcast on SBS TV between March 23 and June 29, 2006. It debuted in mainland Asia through Animax on January 27, 2010. It was first broadcast in the United Kingdom on Viceland in partnership with Anime Limited beginning on August 22, 2017, in its early morning slot. It formed part of a new anime-focused block alongside other series including Cowboy Bebop and Tokyo Ghoul. The series was added to the online library of Crunchyroll in 2016. Following Sony's acquisition of Crunchyroll and merger with Funimation under the former's brand, the series was fully moved to the Crunchyroll streaming platform.

=== Home media ===
The anime was first released on DVD in Japan through the JVC label across thirteen volumes with two episodes each from August 21, 2004, to August 25, 2005. A complete collection for DVD and Blu-ray, featuring new illustrations by Nakazawa and a booklet containing an interview with Watanabe, was released in July 2011.

In North America, Geneon Entertainment released the series on DVD across seven volumes, with volume 2, 3 and 4 also releasing for Universal Media Disc. The volumes were released between January 11, 2005, and January 17, 2006. A complete set followed on July 4 of the same year. Samurai Champloo was among the anime licenses left open for acquisition when Geneon Entertainment ended anime distribution in 2007. Funimation picked up North American distribution rights in 2008, releasing a complete DVD collection on June 30, 2009. A complete series Blu-ray was then released six months later on December 15. Funimation re-released the series for DVD and Blu-ray on May 24, 2011, through the company's original Anime Classics line. The Blu-ray got another re-release on February 5, 2019.

Samurai Champloo was released in the United Kingdom by MVM Entertainment, at first across seven volumes between September 5, 2005, and October 16, 2006. It was re-released as a complete collection on September 3, 2007. It was released in mainland Asia by Singapore-based Odex on Video CD across two volumes in 2006, featuring Japanese and English audio and English subtitles. Madman Entertainment released the series as a complete collection for Blu-ray on June 15, 2011.

== Related media ==
A manga adaptation written by Masaru Gotsubo was serialized in Kadokawa Shoten's Monthly Shōnen Ace from January 26, 2004, to September 25. Gotsubo decided not to follow the series narrative, calling that approach both boring and "impossible". Instead, aside from the opening section, he created an original narrative using the central cast. The manga was collected in two tankōbon volumes, released on July 28 and October 26, 2004. A compilation of the two volumes was released on January 28, 2011. It was licensed for a North American release by Tokyopop. The volumes were released on November 8, 2005, and March 7, 2006. The volumes were released in Australia on February 15 and March 15, 2006.

A companion book featuring artwork and interviews, Samurai Champloo Roman Album, was published by Tokuma Shoten on June 6, 2005, and reissued in May 2014. An English edition was published by Dark Horse Comics on February 21, 2007. A film comic adaptation of the opening episodes, intended to be the start of a series, was co-published in 2006 by Bandai Entertainment and Diamond Comics. American company Triad Toys licensed toy rights from Geneon in 2008, releasing figures of Mugen and Jin.

An action video game adaptation, Samurai Champloo: Sidetracked, was developed by Grasshopper Manufacture and published by Bandai Namco Games in Japan and North America in 2006. It tells a storyline separate from the series, described by the publisher as a "lost episode". Company founder Goichi Suda acted as its director and writer, with Grasshopper's mandate being to preserve the series' original tone and style. The music was composed by Masafumi Takada, inspired by the anime's music. A social card battle game developed by Cybird was released in Japan on August 28, 2011, for mobile phones.

In March 2026, Tomorrow Studios announced that it is working on a live-action adaptation of Samurai Champloo, with the series creator, Shinichirō Watanabe, attached to the project.

== Reception ==
The North American DVD release of Samurai Champloo was a commercial success. The final volumes were ranked by Nielsen VideoScan as among the top ten best-selling anime DVDs during mid-January 2006. On review aggregate website Rotten Tomatoes, the anime has a rating of 89% based on nine reviews. The Western home media releases saw positive responses for their visual and sound quality, though a lack of extras was noted.

Tasha Robinson, in a review of the first English DVD release for Sci-Fi Weekly, was concerned about the opening episode's similarity to the set-up for Cowboy Bebop. In a similar review for Play Magazine, Dave Halverson noted his enjoyment of the story but felt readers should see the anime with as little story information as possible. DVDTalk's Todd Douglass noted the simple premise of the story, but enjoyed each episode's plot and praised the interactions of the main cast and its sense of style. Nick Browne of THEM Anime was less positive, faulting its weaker multi-episode stories and uneven treatment of serious cultural issues despite enjoying the humor born from its main cast. Salvan Bonaminio of The Escapist described the main cast as stereotypes, faulted the forgettable supporting cast, and called many episodes including the ending underwhelming. James Beckett of Anime News Network enjoyed the main cast, but negatively cited a lack of cohesion across the series, and strongly criticised Fuu's frequent kidnappings for story purposes as detrimental to her character.

Halverson gave praise to the animation and character designs without specific commentary, while Robinson positively compared the fight choreography and art design to Watanabe's work on Cowboy Bebop and The Animatrix. Douglass cited the anime as a perfect example of Watanabe's visual style, and Browne cited its visuals and technical achievements as high points. Bonaminio included a positive mention of the anime's visible production quality during his summary. Becket felt the animation style had aged poorly, though giving praise to the art style and fight sequences. The music met with general praise for its use and style. Becket additionally praised the English dub.

The mixture of traditional elements with hip hop met with some mixed responses. Halverson was enthusiastic about them and called the hip hop representation superior to many Western portrayals. Robinson also enjoyed them, noting that they kept the anime from being too much like Cowboy Bebop. Browne enjoyed the contemporary visual references used alongside the Edo setting, but faulted the show's reliance on them. By contrast, Bonaminio cited its sense of style and unique blend of elements its greatest strength.

As part of a 2007 retrospective article on Geneon Entertainment, David Smith of IGN called it one of the best anime published by the company during its lifetime, saying it was almost perfect in what it did and stood out from other Geneon properties. Mike Dent of Otaku USA Magazine, writing in 2015, praised the music for adding to each episode's atmosphere, in addition to its animation quality and writing. In a 2019 retrospective for Anime News Network, Matthew Roe states "the mixture of hip-hop aesthetics and classic samurai tropes seems like a more awkward fit than Bebop's effortless fusion of jazz and science fiction" and further criticized a lack of emotional resonance, but felt the direction of Watanabe and Manglobe kept the series going. Reuben Baron of The Verge, writing in a 2021 article on Watanabe's work, called Samurai Champloo the director's second most popular work after Cowboy Bebop, citing its humor and themes as positives. The ambient soundtrack was ranked by IGN as tenth among their Top Ten Anime Themes and Soundtracks of All Time.
