= You the Rock =

- Also known as: YTR
- Born: Yu Takemae; 5 September 1971 (age 54); Nagano, Nagano, Japan
- Genres: Hip hop
- Occupations: Hip hop MC; tarento
- Labels: Ki/oon; Tokuma Japan Communications; Gate

You the Rock (stylized as YOU THE ROCK★; born Yu Takemae (竹前 裕, Takemae Yū); 5 September 1971, in Nagano, Nagano) is a Japanese hip-hop musician, MC and tarento. He is nicknamed You-chan (Youちゃん) and Yū-chan Da Aniki YTR (ユウちゃん DA 兄貴 YTR).

== Discography ==
=== Albums ===
	Year	Title
	1992	Never Die
	1993	Tight But Fat
1st	1996	The Soundtrack '96
2nd	1998	The Graffiti Rock '98
3rd	1999	The Professional Entertainer
4th	2002	XTRM
Best	2003	I Love You the Rock-Best
5th	2005	No Sell Out '05
6th	2007	Big Vip Hop
7th	2009	The Rock

=== Singles ===
	Year	Title
	1993	"Lirics"
1st	1998	"Rock the Point"
2nd	1999	"The Professional Entertainer (The Ruler's Back)"
3rd	2002	"Hip Hop Royal"
4th	2002	"Monster Lock"
5th	2004	"Grand Master Fresh Pt. 2" featuring Fantastic Plastic Machine
6th	2005	"Untold Story"

=== Analogue ===
Year	Title
	"Free feat. Twigy"
1998	"Duck Rock Fever"
1998	"Hoo! Ei! Ho! '98"
1998	"Future Rock 2001 -Return of B.O.H.-"
1998	"Love da Love"
1999	"The Professional Entertainer / Rap Machine"
1999	"Manhattan Dream / Japan in the House" ft. Boy-Ken
1999	"Joke Talks No (Get Up Brother)" featuring G.K.Maryan, Dev Large
2000	"Chō Raku C-E-Z 2000 (Get Busy Y'all!) / Rocky Road (Yūjō BBS)"
2004	"Grand Master Fresh Pt. 2" feat. Fantastic Plastic Machine
2005	"Untold Story"
2005	"Daz"

=== Main guest appearances ===
Year	Artist	Title
1992	DJ Doc. Holiday	The Rhythm.The Rebel
1992	Omnibus	Rhythm CD I
1994	Love Tambourines	Midnight Parade Remixes
1995	Cool Spoon	Two Mohicans
1995	ECD	Homesick
1995	ECD	Summer Madness / Live at Slits
1996	Lamp Eye	"Shōgen"
1997	Kaminari-Kazoku.	"Kaminari / Yoru Jet"
1997	ECD	ECD no Remixes Vol. 1 cutting edge
1997	ECD	Big Youth
1998	Omnibus	Far East Coasting –Non Stop Mixed By DJ Masterkey–
1998	Omnibus	avex The Album
1998	Omnibus	Atom Kids Tribute to the King "O.T."
1999	Kan Takagi	Hello
1999	Mahha 25	PH-OSY
1999	V.I.P.	"Dancehall Checker"
2000	Omnibus	Mad Maxx
2000	Silva	Comingout
2000	Silva vs You the Rock	"Virgin Killer"
2000	Nona Reeves	"DJ! DJ! –Todokanu Omoi–" feat. You the Rock
2000	Pizzicato Five	"Tokyo no Gasshō"
2001	Pizzicato Five	Sa-e-ra Japon
2001	Twigy	"Freedom"
2001	Rino Latina II	Carnival of Rino
2002	Rino Latina II	Tokyo Tetsu Kon-kin Cleat Jungle Nirei Rei nishiki Remix
2003	ECD	Master
2003	Omnibus	DJ Digs Main Street Electrical Parade
2003	Fumiya Fujii	Right Here! Right Now!
2003	Nona Reeves	"Changin'"
2004	Nigo	(B)Ape Sounds
2004	Hannyan	Ohayō Nippon
2004	Eliana	Akarui Mirai
2004	Boy-Ken	Evrythin' Is Everythin'
2004	Muro	Back II Back 2
2005	Nigo	Return of the Ape Sounds
2005	Omnibus	Entotsu Sampler Vol. 2
2005	G.K.Maryan	Soul on Keep
2006	Rino Latina II	II (The Second)
2006	Twigy	Twig
2006	Yoshipi Da Gama	Energy Kakumei
2007	Twigy	akasatana
2007	Juno Mak	Chapel of Dawn
2007	El Amazon	El Hot
2007	Zen-La-Rock	Zen-La-Rock
2008	Ami Suzuki	Dolce
2008	Twigy	Baby's Choice
2009	Disoscillators	Last Rockers
2009	Microphone Pager	Ōdō Rakudo
2009	Mika Akira	"The Rap Idol"
2011	Kaminari-Kazoku./Rino Latina II, Pit-Gob 53, D.O, You the Rock	"Kaminari Keihō"

== Music videos ==
Director	Title
Catero Alain Colbert	"Banging Shake It (Hip Hop)"
Yuta Kimura	"Di Children"
Yuta Kimura	"Resurrection" feat. Den, Utamaru
Yuichi Kodama	"Grand Master Fresh Pt. 2" feat. Fantastic Plastic Machine
Yuichi Kodama	"Grand Master Fresh Pt. 2 (Long Ver.)" feat. Fantastic Plastic Machine
Daisuke Kondo	"Hip Hop Royal"
Taitaro	"Hip Hop Royal (Space Shower TV ver.)" x
Mizuhiro Sabine	"Monster Lock"
Ranran.	"Untold Story"
Unknown	"Hoo! Ei! Ho! '98"
Unknown	"The Professional Entertainer"

== Major casting works ==
=== TV dramas ===
Year	Title	Network	Ep.
2002	Kekkon Dorobō	NHK-G	
2005	Tiger & Dragon	TBS	
2008	Mirai Kōshi meguru	TV Asahi	1

=== Variety programmes ===
Year	Title	Network
1999	Beat Bang	TV Tokyo
1999	Inazuma	Space Shower TV
2000	CDTV-Neo	TBS
2000	Dengeki Request: Dynamo	Space Shower TV
2001	Goofy	Space Shower TV
2002	Under CDTV	TBS
2002	Girigiri 7	Space Shower TV
2004	Tensai terebi-kun Max	NHK-E
2004	Tokyo Kinba	BS Fuji
2004	Bape TV	Space Shower TV
2005	GyaO Freaks	GyaO
2007	Ameba Banchō	Cyber Agent
2008	Ranking to Get Ill	Cyber Agent
2014	DaBaDaBa Fresh	CTC

=== Radio ===
Year	Title	Network
1995	Hip Hop Night Flight	Tokyo FM
1999	You the Rock the Professional Entertainer	Tokyo FM

=== Advertisements ===
Year	Title
2000	Fast Retailing "Uniqlo no Fleece"
2001	Toyo Suisan "Mukashi nagara no Sauce Yakisoba"

=== Advertisement narrations ===
Year	Title
2000	Orix Blue Wave "Ichiro Casual"
2002	Achilles "Skechers"
2002	Kirin Beverage "Amino Suppli"
2002	Apple Computer "iPod guruguru Drive"
2003	Japan Coca-Cola "Vanilla Coca-Cola"
2003	Asahi Beverage "Mitsuya Cider"
2004	Asahi Beer "Asahi Honjō"
2004	Oriental Land "TDL Buzz Lightyear Natsu no Dai Sakusen"
2005	Asahi Kasei Life & Living "Saran Wrap, Zip Rock Tsukael"
2006	Nissan "Wing Road"
2006	Japan McDonald's "McDonald's Happy Set"
2007	Ezaki Glico "Glico Katayaki Pretz"
2007	Nissan "Nissan Cube"
2007	Sky Perfect Communications "Sky PerfecTV! Natsu! Nama Live Matsuri"
2008	Cadbury Japan "Chlorets Ice"
2008	Ezaki Glico "Pretz"
2008	Ezaki Glico "Papiko"

== Main live ==
Year	Title
1996	San Ping Camp
1999	Space Shower TV Sweet Love Shower 1999
2000	Rush Ball 2000
2005	Summer Sonic 2005
2008	Wave Music Fes 2008 in Naeba
2012	Kizuna –Daisanshō—
2014	Ringo Ongaku-sai 2014
2015	Tone River Jam '15

== See also ==
- MTV
