= Fat Jon =

American rapper (born 1975)

- Also known as: Fat Jon the Ample Soul Physician, Maurice Galactica
- Born: Jon Erin Marshall; September 8, 1975 (age 51); Cincinnati, Ohio, U.S.
- Genres: Hip hop Instrumental hip hop Lo-fi music
- Occupations: Producer, Rapper, DJ
- Instruments: Sampler, Vocals
- Labels: Ample Soul, Mush Records, Dimid, Exceptional Records, Libyus Music, Project Mooncircle
- Website: amplesoul.com

Jon Erin Marshall (born September 8, 1975), better known by his stage name Fat Jon the Ample Soul Physician, is an American hip hop producer and rapper from Cincinnati, Ohio. He is a member of the American hip-hop group Five Deez. He is also one half of 3582 with J. Rawls, one half of Rebel Clique with vocalist Amleset Solomon, and one half of Beautiful Killing Machine with Sonic Brown of Five Deez. Fat Jon is also credited as part of the production team that scored the music for the anime series Samurai Champloo. He currently resides in Frankfurt, Germany.

== Discography ==
=== Solo albums ===
- Humanoid Erotica (2001) as Maurice Galactica
- Wave Motion (2001)
- Lightweight Heavy (2002)
- Afterthought (2004)
- Hundred Eight Stars (2007)
- Repaint Tomorrow (2008)
- Rapture Kontrolle (2012) as Maurice Galactica
- God's Fifth Wish (2020)
- Plaything: Cipher (2022) as Maurice Galactica
- Obscurity Continuum (2024)
- Black Time Circle (2026)

=== Group albums ===
- Koolmotor (2001) (with Five Deez)
- The Living Soul (2001) (with J. Rawls, as 3582)
- Kinkynasti (2003) (with Five Deez)
- Situational Ethics (2003) (with J. Rawls, as 3582)
- Slow Children Playing (2005) (with Five Deez)
- Unique Connection (2005) (with Amleset Solomon, as Rebel Clique)
- Kommunicator (2006) (with Five Deez)
- Still Curious (2007) (with Amleset Solomon, as Rebel Clique)
- Beautiful Killing Machine (2010) (with Sonic Brown of Five Deez, as Beautiful Killing Machine)

=== Collaboration albums ===
- The Same Channel (2006) (with Styrofoam)

=== Soundtrack albums ===
- Samurai Champloo Music Record: Departure (2004) (with Nujabes)
- Samurai Champloo Music Record: Impression (2004) (with FORCE OF NATURE and Nujabes)
- Tephlon Funk: The Free Tape (2016)
- Tephlon Funk: The Dope Tape (2020)

=== EPs ===
- Stasis (2000)
- Dyslexic (2000)

=== Singles ===
- Everywhere (2004)
- Torn Again (2004)

=== Productions ===
- "Neapolitan" by Doseone on Hemispheres (1998)
- "Outreach 5" by Mr. Dibbs on The 30th Song (2003)
