= Pizzicato Five discography =

- Studio albums: 13
- Extended plays: 13
- Soundtrack albums: 1
- Live albums: 1
- Compilation albums: 16
- Singles: 22
- Video albums: 6
- Remix albums: 9

The discography of Japanese Shibuya-kei group Pizzicato Five includes 13 studio albums, one live album, one soundtrack album, 16 compilation albums, nine remix albums, six video albums, 13 extended plays and 22 singles.

== Albums ==
=== Studio albums ===
List of studio albums, with selected chart positions
Title	Details	Peak chart positions
Title	Details	JPN
Couples	Released: April 1, 1987; Label: CBS/Sony; Formats: CD, LP	49 (Note: On initial release, Couples did not enter the Oricon Albums Chart. It peaked at number 49 after being reissued in 2016.)
Bellissima!	Released: September 21, 1988; Label: CBS/Sony; Formats: CD, LP	39 (Note: On initial release, Bellissima! peaked at number 86 on the Oricon Albums Chart. It peaked at number 39 after being reissued in 2016.)
On Her Majesty's Request (Note: Reissued as By Her Majesty's Request in 1995 and 2004)	Released: July 21, 1989; Label: CBS/Sony; Formats: CD	80 (Note: On initial release, On Her Majesty's Request peaked at number 88 on the Oricon Albums Chart. It peaked at number 80 after being reissued in 2018.)
Soft Landing on the Moon	Released: May 21, 1990; Label: CBS/Sony; Formats: CD	56
This Year's Girl	Released: September 1, 1991; Label: Seven Gods; Formats: CD	58
Sweet Pizzicato Five	Released: September 21, 1992; Label: Triad; Formats: CD	54
Bossa Nova 2001	Released: June 1, 1993; Label: Triad; Formats: CD	7
Overdose	Released: October 1, 1994; Label: Triad; Formats: CD	9
Romantique 96	Released: September 30, 1995; Label: Triad; Formats: CD	10
Happy End of the World	Released: June 21, 1997; Label: Readymade; Formats: CD	15
The International Playboy & Playgirl Record	Released: October 1, 1998; Label: Readymade; Formats: CD, LP	19
Pizzicato Five	Released: November 20, 1999; Label: Readymade; Formats: CD	31
Çà et là du Japon	Released: January 1, 2001; Label: Readymade; Formats: CD	44

=== Live albums ===
List of live albums, with selected chart positions
Title	Details	Peak chart positions
Title	Details	JPN
Instant Replay	Released: March 21, 1993; Label: Triad; Formats: CD	65

=== Soundtrack albums ===
List of soundtrack albums, with selected chart positions
Title	Details	Peak chart positions
Title	Details	JPN
Hi Guys! Let Me Teach You	Released: May 21, 1991; Label: Seven Gods; Formats: CD	80

=== Compilation albums ===
List of compilation albums, with selected chart positions
Title	Details	Peak chart positions
Title	Details	JPN
Pizzicatomania! (Note: Reissued as Pizzicato Five 85 in 2001)	Released: July 21, 1987; Label: Non-Standard; Formats: CD	172 (Note: On initial release, Pizzicatomania! did not enter the Oricon Albums Chart. It peaked at number 172 after being reissued in 2017.)
Pizzicato Five TYO: Big Hits and Jet Lags 1991–1995	Released: March 1, 1995; Label: Triad; Formats: CD	10
Antique 96	Released: November 1, 1995; Label: Sony; Formats: CD	—
Non-Standard Years: Pizzicato Five '85–'86	Released: November 22, 1995; Label: Non-Standard; Formats: CD	—
Great White Wonder: Rare Masters 1990–1996	Released: October 1, 1996; Label: Triad; Formats: CD	24
Pizzicato Five JPN: Big Hits and Jet Lags 1994–1997	Released: December 10, 1997; Label: Readymade; Formats: CD	18
Pizzicato Five R.I.P.: Big Hits and Jet Lags 1998–2001	Released: March 31, 2001; Label: Readymade; Formats: CD	22
Singles	Released: June 21, 2001; Label: Readymade; Formats: CD	45
The Band of 20th Century: Sony Music Years 1986–1990	Released: April 28, 2004; Label: GT; Formats: CD	195
Pizzicato Five I Love You	Released: March 31, 2006; Label: Readymade; Formats: CD	—
Pizzicato Five We Love You	Released: March 31, 2006; Label: Readymade; Formats: CD	—
The Band of 20th Century: Nippon Columbia Years 1991–2001	Released: November 3, 2019; Label: Readymade; Formats: CD, 7" box set, digital download, streaming	33
Pizzicato Five on Demand (Keitarō Takanami Edition)	Released: September 22, 2021; Label: Readymade; Formats: Digital download, streaming	—
Pizzicato Five on Demand (Yasuharu Konishi Edition)	Released: October 20, 2021; Label: Readymade; Formats: Digital download, streaming	—
Pizzicato Five on Demand (Maki Nomiya Edition)	Released: November 17, 2021; Label: Readymade; Formats: Digital download, streaming	—
Pizzicato Five in Hi-Fi	Released: November 24, 2021; Label: Readymade; Formats: CD	120
"—" denotes a recording that did not chart or was not released in that territory.

=== Remix albums ===
List of remix albums, with selected chart positions
Title	Details	Peak chart positions
Title	Details	JPN
Pizzicato Free Soul	Released: October 21, 1992; Label: Triad; Formats: LP	—
Souvenir 2001	Released: July 1, 1993; Label: Triad; Formats: CD	38
Expo 2001	Released: November 1, 1993; Label: Triad; Formats: CD	30
Free Soul 2001	Released: November 21, 1993; Label: Triad; Formats: LP	—
A Quiet Couple	Released: November 1, 1995; Label: Sony; Formats: CD	—
Happy End of You	Released: May 5, 1998; Label: Matador; Formats: LP and CD	—
Pizzicato Five in the Bag	Released: January 29, 2000; Label: Readymade; Formats: 7" and 12" box set	—
Pizzicato Five Remixes 2000	Released: March 18, 2000; Label: Readymade; Formats: CD	—
Pizzicato Five in the Mix	Released: December 21, 2001; Label: Readymade; Formats: CD	—
Pizzicato Five We Dig You	Released: May 24, 2006; Label: Readymade; Formats: CD	—
"—" denotes a recording that did not chart or was not released in that territory.

=== Video albums ===
List of video albums, with selected chart positions
Title	Details	Peak chart positions
Title	Details	JPN DVD
This Year's Girl in Action	Released: November 21, 1991; Label: Seven Gods; Formats: VHS	—
Miss Pizzicato Five Superstar	Released: July 1, 1992; Label: Triad; Formats: VHS	—
Readymade TV Volume One	Released: July 21, 1994; Label: Triad; Formats: VHS	—
Readymade TV Volume Two	Released: January 21, 1998; Label: Readymade; Formats: VHS	—
Readymade TV Volume Three	Released: November 22, 2000; Label: Readymade; Formats: DVD	—
The Band of 20th Century	Released: March 31, 2004; Label: Readymade; Formats: DVD box set	63
"—" denotes a recording that did not chart or was not released in that territory.

== Extended plays ==
List of extended plays, with selected chart positions
Title	Details	Peak chart positions
Title	Details	JPN
This Year's Model	Released: June 1, 1991; Label: Seven Gods; Formats: CD	93
London-Paris-Tokyo	Released: July 1, 1991; Label: Seven Gods; Formats: CD	82
Readymade Recordings	Released: August 1, 1991; Label: Seven Gods; Formats: CD	64
A Television's Workshop (Note: Issued as A Children's Workshop in cassette format)	Released: February 10, 1994; Label: Triad; Formats: CD, cassette	33
Combinaison Spaciale EP: Pizzicato Five in Dub	Released: June 21, 1996; Label: Triad; Formats: CD, 10"	22
Sister Freedom Tapes	Released: June 21, 1996; Label: Triad; Formats: CD, 10"	21
Porno 3003	Released: October 10, 1997; Label: Readymade; Formats: CD	—
Darlin' of Discothèque	Released: April 21, 1999; Label: Readymade; Formats: CD	38 (Note: Peak chart position on Oricon Singles Chart)
Nonstop to Tokyo	Released: July 17, 1999; Label: Readymade; Formats: CD	55
A Perfect World	Released: October 21, 1999; Label: Readymade; Formats: CD	79
Pizzicato Five VS Darlin' of Discothèque	Released: November 20, 1999; Label: Readymade; Formats: 12"	—
Voyage à Tokyo	Released: September 27, 2000; Label: Readymade; Formats: CD, 10", 12"	40
24 Decembre	Released: November 22, 2000; Label: Readymade; Formats: CD, 12"	67
"—" denotes a recording that did not chart or was not released in that territory.

== Singles ==
List of singles, with selected chart positions, showing year released and album name
Title	Year	Peak chart positions	Album
Title	Year	JPN	Album
"The Audrey Hepburn Complex"	1985	—	Non-album singles
"Action"	1986	—	Non-album singles
"Lovers Rock"	1990	92 (Note: On initial release, "Lovers Rock" did not enter the Oricon Singles Chart. It peaked at number 92 after being reissued in 2018.)	Non-album singles
"Sweet Soul Revue"	1993	19	Bossa Nova 2001
"The Night Is Still Young"	1993	50	Overdose
"Happy Sad"	1994	66	Overdose
"Superstar"	1994	77	Overdose
"On the Sunny Side of the Street"	1994	—	Overdose
"Triste"	1995	95	Romantique 96
"Baby Portable Rock"	1996	19	Non-album singles
"A Message Song"	1996	68	Non-album singles
"It's a Beautiful Day"	1997	47	Happy End of the World
"Mon amour Tokyo"	1997	—	Happy End of the World
"I Hear a Symphony"	1997	92	The International Playboy & Playgirl Record
"La Règle du jeu"	1998	79	The International Playboy & Playgirl Record
"Such a Beautiful Girl Like You"	1998	—	The International Playboy & Playgirl Record
"Week-End"	1998	—	The International Playboy & Playgirl Record
"Playboy Playgirl"	1998	—	The International Playboy & Playgirl Record
"Seven O'Clock News" / "They All Laughed"	2017	123	Couples
"Planets" / "This Can't Be Love"	2017	99	Bellissima!
"Let's Spend the Night Together" / "Holiday for Audrey H" / "Bellisima '90"	2018	75	On Her Majesty's Service
"À Tokyo" (featuring Shigeru Matsuzaki and You the Rock)	2021	57	Çà et là du Japon
"—" denotes a recording that did not chart or was not released in that territory.

== Matador Records releases ==
=== Studio albums ===
List of studio albums, with selected chart positions
Title	Details	Peak chart positions
Title	Details	US Heat.
Happy End of the World	Released: September 9, 1997; Label: Matador; Formats: CD, LP	32
Playboy & Playgirl	Released: April 20, 1999; Label: Matador; Formats: CD, LP	—
The Fifth Release from Matador	Released: November 14, 2000; Label: Matador; Formats: CD, LP	—
"—" denotes a recording that did not chart or was not released in that territory.

=== Compilation albums ===
List of compilation albums
Title	Details
Made in USA	Released: October 11, 1994; Label: Matador; Formats: CD, LP, cassette
The Sound of Music by Pizzicato Five	Released: October 31, 1995; Label: Matador; Formats: CD, LP, cassette

=== Remix albums ===
List of remix albums
Title	Details
Happy End of You	Released: May 5, 1998; Label: Matador; Formats: CD, LP

=== Extended plays ===
List of extended plays
Title	Details
Five by Five	Released: July 19, 1994; Label: Matador; Formats: CD, 12"
Quickie	Released: March 14, 1995; Label: Matador; Formats: CD, 12"
Sister Freedom Tapes	Released: February 11, 1997; Label: Matador; Formats: CD, 10"
Combinaison Spaciale EP: Pizzicato Five in Dub	Released: February 25, 1997; Label: Matador; Formats: CD, 10"

=== Singles ===
List of singles, with selected chart positions, showing year released and album name
Title	Year	Peak chart positions		Album
Title	Year	UK	US Dance	Album
"CDJ"	1995	—	—	The Sound of Music by Pizzicato Five
"Happy Sad"	1995	79	47	The Sound of Music by Pizzicato Five
"Mon amour Tokyo"	1997	72	—	Happy End of the World
"Contact"	1997	—	—	Happy End of You
"Trailer Music"	1997	—	—	Happy End of You
"Love's Theme"	1997	—	—	Happy End of You
"Happy Ending"	1997	—	—	Happy End of You
"Porno 3003"	1997	—	—	Happy End of You
"—" denotes a recording that did not chart or was not released in that territory.

== Other appearances ==
List of other appearances, showing year released and album name
Title	Year	Album
"What's New Pizzicato!"	1985	The Best of Non-Standard
"Kiss, Kiss, Bang! Bang!"	1986	Winter Lounge
"Me Japanese Boy" (DJ Krush remix)	1994	Tribute to Burt Bacharach
"Nata di marzo"	1996	Sushi 3003
"The Girl from Ipanema"	1997	Lounge-A-Palooza and Pink Panther's Penthouse Party
"Lesson 3003 (Part 1)"	1998	Sushi 4004
"Trailer Music" (Trailer Mambo Music Novophonic remix)	1998	Readymade Records Remixes
"Mon amour Tokyo" (Mon amour Kyotokyo mix)	1998	Readymade Records Remixes
"Collision and Improvisation" (Dizzy Fugu mix)	1998	Readymade Records Remixes
"Porno 3003" (remixed by Thievery Corporation)	1998	Readymade Records Remixes
"Collision and Improvisation" (Jazz Brothers mix)	1998	Readymade Records Remixes
"One Two Three Four Five Six Seven Eight Nine Ten Barbie Dolls"	1999	Everything Is Nice: The Matador Records 10th Anniversary Anthology
"Watashi no Subete (Tanpen Eiga no Tame no Arrange)"	2000	Viva la Generation Readymade 2000
