= The Sound of Music by Pizzicato Five =

Compilation album by Pizzicato Five
- Released: October 31, 1995
- Genre: Shibuya-kei
- Length: 65:38 (CD); 71:04 (LP)
- Label: Matador
- Producer: Pizzicato Five

Pizzicato Five US chronology
Made in USA (1994)	The Sound of Music by Pizzicato Five (1995)	Happy End of the World (1997)

The Sound of Music by Pizzicato Five is a compilation album by Japanese pop band Pizzicato Five. The album was released in the United States on October 31, 1995, by Matador Records, serving as the band's second full-length, and third overall, American release on the label. Following the previous year's Made in USA, The Sound of Music by Pizzicato Five is Matador's second compilation of Pizzicato Five's previously released material.

== Background ==
The track selection on The Sound of Music by Pizzicato Five emphasizes Pizzicato Five's albums Bossa Nova 2001 (1993) and Overdose (1994), while Romantique 96 (1995), their most recent studio album at the time, is represented by one track, a cover of Plastics' "Good". The title The Sound of Music and the front cover slogan "music is organised by sound" are taken from the Romantique 96 song "The Sound of Music", though the track itself does not appear on the compilation.

The LP edition has a slightly rearranged track order and contains alternate versions of "Good", "Fortune Cookie" and "Rock n' Roll".

== Critical reception ==
Professional ratings
Review scores
Source	Rating
AllMusic	4/5 stars
Entertainment Weekly	B+
The Guardian	3/5 stars
NME	6/10
The Philadelphia Inquirer	3/4 stars
Q	4/5 stars
Rolling Stone	2/5 stars
Spin	8/10

Spin critic Barry Walters described The Sound of Music by Pizzicato Five as "the most fully realized, personality-rich synthesis of popular culture that's come about this decade", finding that the compiled material showcased the band's move toward "a little less funky, a bit more thumpy and considerably fuller and jazzier" sound. "While their retro tendencies lend a patina of kitsch to the proceedings," wrote Entertainment Weekly's Mike Flaherty, "they go at it with a sophistication and polish that sidesteps cheese. In other words, they mean it."

== Track listing ==
All lyrics are written by Yasuharu Konishi, except where noted; all music is composed by Konishi, except where noted.

CD edition
No.	Title	Lyrics	Music	Original release	Length
1.	"We Love Pizzicato Five"	Lee Adams	Charles Strouse	TYO: Big Hits and Jet Lags 1991–1995	0:20
2.	"Rock n' Roll"			Bossa Nova 2001	2:23
3.	"The Night Is Still Young"			"The Night Is Still Young" single (included on Overdose in remixed form)	5:02
4.	"Happy Sad"	Konishi; Terri MacMillan; Momoko Suzuki		Overdose	5:09
5.	"Groovy Is My Name"			Bossa Nova 2001	3:24
6.	"Sophisticated Catchy"			Bossa Nova 2001	2:37
7.	"Strawberry Sleighride"			Bossa Nova 2001	4:07
8.	"If I Were a Groupie"	Konishi; Maki Nomiya	Konishi; Yukihiro Fukutomi	Overdose	5:00
9.	"Sweet Thursday"			Bossa Nova 2001	3:46
10.	"CDJ"			TYO: Big Hits and Jet Lags 1991–1995 (included on Sweet Pizzicato Five in original form)	5:44
11.	"Fortune Cookie"			"Superstar" single	5:01
12.	"Good"	Chica Sato	Hajime Tachibana	Romantique 96	3:31
13.	"Number Five"			Readymade Recordings	4:59
14.	"Peace Music" (St. Etienne remix)	Nomiya		Expo 2001 (as "Peace Music (Pease Pottagemix)")	8:45
15.	"Airplane"			Overdose	5:16
16.	"Rock n' Roll"			Souvenir 2001	0:34
Total length:					65:38

LP edition
No.	Title	Lyrics	Music	Original release	Length
1.	"We Love Pizzicato Five"	Adams	Strouse	TYO: Big Hits and Jet Lags 1991–1995	0:20
2.	"Rock n' Roll"			Bossa Nova 2001	2:23
3.	"The Night Is Still Young"			"The Night Is Still Young" single (included on Overdose in remixed form)	5:02
4.	"Happy Sad"	Konishi; MacMillan; Suzuki		Overdose	5:09
5.	"Groovy Is My Name"			Bossa Nova 2001	3:24
6.	"Sophisticated Catchy"			Bossa Nova 2001	2:37
7.	"If I Were a Groupie"	Konishi; Nomiya	Konishi; Fukutomi	Overdose	5:00
8.	"Strawberry Sleighride"			Bossa Nova 2001	4:07
9.	"Sweet Thursday"			Bossa Nova 2001	3:46
10.	"Good"	Sato	Tachibana	Romantique 96	3:59
11.	"CDJ"			TYO: Big Hits and Jet Lags 1991–1995 (included on Sweet Pizzicato Five in original form)	5:44
12.	"No. 5"			Readymade Recordings	4:59
13.	"Fortune Cookie"			"Superstar" single	4:38
14.	"We Love Pizzicato Five"	Adams	Strouse	TYO: Big Hits and Jet Lags 1991–1995	3:28
15.	"Rock n' Roll"			Souvenir 2001	2:27
16.	"Airplane"			Overdose	5:16
17.	"Peace Music" (St. Etienne remix)	Nomiya		Expo 2001 (as "Peace Music (Pease Pottagemix)")	8:45
Total length:					71:04

Notes

- "Happy Sad", "If I Were a Groupie" and "CDJ" feature re-recorded English vocals.
