= Made in USA (Pizzicato Five album) =

Compilation album by Pizzicato Five
- Released: October 11, 1994
- Genre: Shibuya-kei
- Length: 45:12
- Label: Matador
- Producer: Pizzicato Five

Pizzicato Five US chronology
Five by Five (1994)	Made in USA (1994)	The Sound of Music by Pizzicato Five (1995)

Made in USA is a compilation album by Japanese pop band Pizzicato Five. The album was released in the United States on October 11, 1994 by Matador Records, serving as the band's first full-length, and second overall, American release on the label. Along with the Five by Five EP released earlier in 1994, it introduced Pizzicato Five to a Western audience.

The compilation is titled after the 1966 film Made in U.S.A., directed by Jean-Luc Godard, one of the band's inspirations.

== Critical reception ==
Professional ratings
Review scores
Source	Rating
AllMusic	4.5/5 stars
The Guardian	3/4 stars
NME	6/10
The Philadelphia Inquirer	3/4 stars
Q	3/5 stars
Spin	7/10
The Village Voice	B

In 2011, Made in USA was included in LA Weekly's "beginner's guide" to Shibuya-kei music.

== Track listing ==
All lyrics are written by Yasuharu Konishi, except where noted; all music is composed by Konishi, except where noted.

No.	Title	Lyrics	Music	Original release	Length
1.	"I"			This Year's Girl	1:51
2.	"Sweet Soul Revue"			Bossa Nova 2001	5:19
3.	"Magic Carpet Ride"	Konishi; Terri MacMillan		Bossa Nova 2001	5:13
4.	"Readymade FM"			This Year's Girl (as "This Year's Girl #5")	0:13
5.	"Baby Love Child"		Keitarō Takanami	This Year's Girl	3:32
6.	"Twiggy Twiggy / Twiggy vs. James Bond"	Nanako Sato	Sato	This Year's Girl	4:03
7.	"This Year's Girl #2"		Konishi; Maki Nomiya	This Year's Model (as "This Year's Girl #1")	5:14
8.	"I Wanna Be Like You"			This Year's Girl (as "Y.O.U.")	4:10
9.	"Go Go Dancer"			Bossa Nova 2001	4:24
10.	"Catchy"			Sweet Pizzicato Five	7:12
11.	"Peace Music"	Nomiya	Takanami	Bossa Nova 2001	3:51
Total length:					45:12

Notes

- "Magic Carpet Ride" and "Baby Love Child" feature re-recorded English vocals.
