= Instant Replay (Pizzicato Five album) =

Live album by Pizzicato Five
- Released: March 21, 1993
- Recorded: December 23, 1992
- Venue: Nakano Sun Plaza (Nakano, Tokyo)
- Genre: Shibuya-kei
- Length: 59:46
- Label: Triad
- Producer: Pizzicato Five

Pizzicato Five chronology
Pizzicato Free Soul (1992)	Instant Replay (1993)	Bossa Nova 2001 (1993)

Alternative cover
- 2006 reissue

Professional ratings
Review scores
Source	Rating
AllMusic	3/5 stars

Instant Replay (インスタント・リプレイ) is a live album by Japanese pop band Pizzicato Five. It was released on March 21, 1993, by the Nippon Columbia imprint Triad. The album was reissued by Readymade Records on March 31, 2006.

== Track listing ==
All lyrics are written by Yasuharu Konishi, except where noted; all music is composed by Konishi, except where noted.

No.	Title	Lyrics	Music	Length
1.	"Soshite Ima Demo" (そして今でも)			3:34
2.	"The Audrey Hepburn Complex / Brigitte Bardot T.N.T." (オードリィ・ヘプバーン・コンプレックス〜ブリジット・バルドーT.N.T)	Konishi; Keitarō Takanami	Takanami	6:23
3.	"Twiggy Twiggy" (トゥイギー・トゥイギー)	Nanako Sato	Sato	3:31
4.	"Shock Treatment" (ショック療法)	Maki Nomiya; Takanami	Takanami	5:18
5.	"Catchy" (キャッチー)			7:34
6.	"Action Painting" (アクション・ペインティング)			7:54
7.	"Watashi no Subete" (私のすべて)			3:41
8.	"They All Laughed" (皆笑った)		Takanami	3:53
9.	"CDJ"			5:01
10.	"Funky Lovechild" (ファンキー・ラヴチャイルド)		Konishi; Takanami	6:11
11.	"Thank You" (サンキュー)			6:16
12.	"Tout va bien" (万事快調)			0:30
Total length:				59:46

== Charts ==
Chart (1993)	Peak position
Japanese Albums (Oricon)	63
