= Five by Five (Pizzicato Five EP) =

EP by Pizzicato Five
- Released: July 19, 1994
- Genre: Shibuya-kei
- Length: 18:05
- Label: Matador
- Producer: Pizzicato Five

Pizzicato Five US chronology
Five by Five (1994)	Made in USA (1994)

Professional ratings
Review scores
Source	Rating
AllMusic	4/5 stars

Five by Five is an EP by Japanese pop band Pizzicato Five. It was released in the United States on July 19, 1994, by Matador Records, serving as the band's debut American release for the label. Five by Five was voted the best EP of 1994 in The Village Voice's year-end Pazz & Jop critics' poll.

== Track listing ==
No.	Title	Writer(s)	Original release	Length
1.	"Pizzicatomania"	Yasuharu Konishi	Expo 2001	0:36
2.	"Baby Love Child" (LA English Mix version)	Konishi; Keitarō Takanami	This Year's Girl	3:32
3.	"This Year's Girl #2"	Konishi	This Year's Model (as "This Year's Girl #1")	5:12
4.	"Twiggy Twiggy / Twiggy vs. James Bond"	Nanako Sato	This Year's Girl	4:03
5.	"Me, Japanese Boy"	Burt Bacharach; Hal David	A Television's Workshop	4:42
Total length:				18:05

Notes

- "Baby Love Child" (LA English Mix version) and "This Year's Girl #2" feature re-recorded English vocals.
