= Happy End of You =

Remix album by Pizzicato Five
- Released: May 5, 1998
- Genre: Shibuya-kei
- Length: 74:57
- Label: Matador
- Producers: Yasuharu Konishi; Yukihiro Fukutomi

Pizzicato Five US chronology
Happy End of the World (1997)	Happy End of You (1998)	Playboy & Playgirl (1999)

Professional ratings
Review scores
Source	Rating
AllMusic	3/5 stars
The Baltimore Sun	3/4 stars
The Guardian	3/5 stars
Pitchfork	7.1/10

Happy End of You is a remix album by Japanese pop band Pizzicato Five. The album was released on May 5, 1998 by Matador Records. It consists of remixes of songs from the band's album Happy End of the World, with the exception of "Contact", which originally appeared on Romantique 96.

== Track listing ==
All tracks are written by Yasuharu Konishi, except where noted.

No.	Title	Writer(s)	Remixer(s)	Length
1.	"Love's Theme" (Automator mix)		Dan the Automator	4:12
2.	"Trailer Music" (808 State remix)		808 State	5:10
3.	"The Earth Goes Around" (Daddy-O Half mix)	Michio Yamagami; Osamu Shoji	Daddy-O	3:43
4.	"Porno 3003" (DJ Dara remix)		DJ Dara	5:52
5.	"Porno 3003" (GusGus mix 2.0 edit)		GusGus	6:35
6.	"My Baby Portable Player Sound" (High Llamas remix)		The High Llamas	6:10
7.	"Happy Ending" (If Then Else mix)	Konishi; Yukihiro Fukutomi; Markus Popp	Oval	5:19
8.	"It's a Beautiful Day (The B-Day Arrangement)"		John Oswald	4:39
9.	"Love's Theme" (Saint Etienne mix)		Saint Etienne	4:50
10.	"Trailer Music" (Ram Tam Tush mix)		Momus	3:12
11.	"Collision and Improvisation" (The Shooter remix)		The Shooter	6:39
12.	"Contact (Dimitri's Voco Dubstramental)"		Dimitri from Paris	7:20
13.	"The World Is Spinning at 45 RPM" (Sunroof mix edit)		Daniel Miller; Gareth Jones	11:11
Total length:				74:57
