= Pizzicato Five (album) =

Studio album by Pizzicato Five
- Released: November 20, 1999
- Genre: Shibuya-kei
- Length: 59:58
- Label: Readymade; Matador
- Producer: Yasuharu Konishi; Yukihiro Fukutomi; Shunsuke Sakamoto; Takeo Sasada; Sohichi Terada

Pizzicato Five chronology
Pizzicato Five VS Darlin' of Discothèque (1999)	Pizzicato Five (1999)	Pizzicato Five in the Bag (2000)

Pizzicato Five US chronology
Playboy & Playgirl (1999)	The Fifth Release from Matador (2000)

Professional ratings
Aggregate scores
Source	Rating
Metacritic	69/100
Review scores
Source	Rating
AllMusic	4/5 stars
Alternative Press	4/5
The Guardian	4/5 stars
Pitchfork	5.9/10

Pizzicato Five (ピチカート・ファイヴ; stylized as Pizzicato Five™) is the twelfth studio album by Japanese pop band Pizzicato Five. The album was released on November 20, 1999, by Readymade Records. Under the title The Fifth Release from Matador, it was released in the United States on November 14, 2000, by Matador Records. Pizzicato Five was reissued on March 31, 2006.

The Japanese edition contains heavily reworked versions of the previously released songs "Darlin' of Discothèque" from the Darlin' of Discothèque EP, "Room Service" – renamed "20th Century Girl" – from the Nonstop to Tokyo EP, and "A Perfect World" from the A Perfect World EP. The American edition omits the song "Love Again" from the Japanese edition and includes the original versions of "Room Service" and "A Perfect World", together with "Tout, tout pour ma chèrie" from Darlin' of Discothèque.

== Track listing ==
All lyrics are written by Yasuharu Konishi, except where noted; all music is composed by Konishi, except where noted.

Pizzicato Five
No.	Title	Lyrics	Music	Length
1.	"Love Again" (また恋におちてしまった)			4:58
2.	"Roma" (ローマ)			2:57
3.	"Loudland!"			4:41
4.	"A Room with a View" (眺めのいい部屋)			4:48
5.	"La guerre est finie" (戦争は終わった)			4:56
6.	"Wild Strawberries" (野いちご)			4:56
7.	"Darlin' of Discothèque" (ダーリン・オブ・ディスコティック)			7:32
8.	"A Perfect World" (パーフェクト・ワールド)			4:41
9.	"20th Century Girl"	Konishi; Margo Guryan	Konishi; Guryan	4:52
10.	"Serial Stories" (連載小説)			3:41
11.	"The World Without You" (あなたのいない世界で)		Masumi Arichika	5:33
12.	"Goodbye Baby & Amen" (グッバイ・ベイビイ＆エイメン)			6:23
Total length:				59:58

The Fifth Release from Matador
No.	Title	Lyrics	Music	Length
1.	"A Perfect World" (single version)			3:58
2.	"Roma"			2:57
3.	"Loudland!"			4:41
4.	"A Room with a View"			4:48
5.	"La guerre est finie"			4:56
6.	"Wild Strawberries"			4:56
7.	"Darlin' of Discothèque"			7:41
8.	"A Perfect World" (album version)			4:31
9.	"20th Century Girl"	Konishi; Guryan	Konishi; Guryan	4:51
10.	"Tout, tout pour ma chèrie"	Michel Polnareff	Polnareff	4:54
11.	"Serial Stories"			3:42
12.	"The World Without You"		Arichika	5:33
13.	"Room Service"			4:28
14.	"Goodbye Baby & Amen"			6:22
Total length:				68:18

Sample credits

- "20th Century Girl" contains samples of "I Don't Intend to Spend Christmas Without You", written by Margo Guryan.

== Charts ==
Chart (1999)	Peak position
Japanese Albums (Oricon)	31
