= Happy End of the World =

- Matador issue

Studio album by Pizzicato Five
- Released: June 21, 1997
- Genre: Shibuya-kei
- Length: 62:40
- Labels: Readymade; Matador
- Producers: Yasuharu Konishi; Yukihiro Fukutomi

Pizzicato Five chronology
Great White Wonder: Rare Masters 1990–1996 (1996)	Happy End of the World (1997)	Porno 3003 (1997)

Pizzicato Five US chronology
The Sound of Music by Pizzicato Five (1995)	Happy End of the World (1997)	Happy End of You (1998)

Singles from Happy End of the World
- 1. "It's a Beautiful Day" Released: March 1, 1997; 2. "Mon amour Tokyo" Released: June 21, 1997

Alternative cover
- 2006 reissue

Happy End of the World (ハッピー・エンド・オブ・ザ・ワールド) is the tenth studio album by Japanese pop band Pizzicato Five. The album was released on June 21, 1997, by Readymade Records. In the United States, it was released by Matador Records on September 9, 1997, and peaked at number 32 on Billboard's Heatseekers Albums chart. A companion remix album, Happy End of You, was released in 1998. Happy End of the World was reissued by Readymade on March 31, 2006.

== Composition ==
On Happy End of the World, Pizzicato Five incorporated influences from contemporary styles of electronic music, including breakbeat, downtempo and drum and bass, into their trademark Shibuya-kei sound. Tokyo Weekender writer Ed Cunningham found that the album saw the band expanding on the "beat-driven experimentation" that had been hinted at on previous albums such as Sweet Pizzicato Five (1992) and Bossa Nova 2001 (1993). He describes it as having "both the density and adventurousness of a plunderphonics record (despite much of it being performed live) and the chilled, featherweight listenability of lounge and easy-listening pop."

== Critical reception ==
Professional ratings
Review scores
Source	Rating
AllMusic	4/5 stars
Entertainment Weekly	A−
The Guardian	3/5 stars
Pitchfork	7.4/10
Q	3/5 stars
Select	4/5
The Times	8/10
Uncut	4/5 stars

Matt Diehl of Entertainment Weekly wrote, "Japan's favorite avant-lounge duo, Pizzicato Five, returns with a more club-oriented set, but their blend of '60s kitsch and savvy pop-culture references remains intact in Happy End of the World, giving the Cardigans a run for the retro-hip money." Writing for The A.V. Club, Stephen Thompson commented, "It's an excellent addition to the duo's expansive canon, and a must for any pop fan who thinks mainstream dance music can and must be better than the 'Barbie Girl' drivel that populates Top 40 radio playlists."

Stephen Thomas Erlewine of AllMusic said, "It's a surprisingly laid-back album, but that's not necessarily a bad thing – the lush arrangements have an engaging, low-key charm, and the beats are nice and subtle." He added, "Happy End of the World runs a little too long, and no song stands out as a single, but it's an engaging record that suggests there may be more to the Pizzicato Five than kitsch."

In 2007, Rolling Stone Japan placed Happy End of the World at number 64 on its list of the "100 Greatest Japanese Rock Albums of All Time".

== Track listing ==
All lyrics are written by Yasuharu Konishi, except where noted; all music is composed by Konishi, except where noted.

No.	Title	Lyrics	Music	Length
1.	"World Is Spinning at 45 RPM" (世界は1分間に45回転で廻っている)			4:40
2.	"The Earth Goes Around" (地球は回るよ)	Michio Yamagami	Osamu Shoji	2:55
3.	"Trailer Music"			1:50
4.	"It's a Beautiful Day" (イッツ・ア・ビューティフル・デイ)			4:26
5.	"Love's Prelude" (愛のプレリュード)			2:18
6.	"Love's Theme" (愛のテーマ)			4:16
7.	"My Baby Portable Player Sound"			5:05
8.	"Mon amour Tokyo" (モナムール東京)			4:55
9.	"Collision and Improvisation" (衝突と即興)			4:35
10.	"Porno 3003"			9:51
11.	"Arigato We Love You" (アリガト WE LOVE YOU)	Gary Arling; Richard Cameron	Konishi; Arling; Cameron	5:15
12.	"Ma vie, l'ete de vie" (私の人生、人生の夏)			5:05
13.	"Happy Ending" (ハッピー・エンディング)		Konishi; Yukihiro Fukutomi	7:29
Total length:				62:40

Notes

- "Porno 3003" is divided into the segments "Music for Sofa" (ソファのための音楽), "Galaxy One" and "It's All Too Beautiful".

== Charts ==
Chart (1997)	Peak position
Japanese Albums (Oricon)	15
US Heatseekers Albums (Billboard)	32
Alternative Radio Airplay (CMJ)	59
CMJ Top 200	25
