= Expo 2001 =

Remix album by Pizzicato Five
- Released: November 1, 1993
- Genre: Shibuya-kei
- Length: 50:08
- Label: Triad

Pizzicato Five chronology
| Souvenir 2001 (1993) | Expo 2001 (1993) | Free Soul 2001 (1993) |

Professional ratings
Review scores
| Source | Rating |
|---|---|
| AllMusic | 2.5/5 stars |

Expo 2001 is a remix album by Japanese pop band Pizzicato Five. It was released on November 1, 1993, by the Nippon Columbia imprint Triad.

== Track listing ==
All tracks are written by Yasuharu Konishi, except where noted.

| No. | Title | Writer(s) | Remixer(s) | Length |
|---|---|---|---|---|
| 1. | "Pizzicatomania" (mixed by Konishi) | Konishi; Shunsuke Sakamoto | | 0:35 |
| 2. | "Catchy (Voltage Unlimited Catchy)" | | Towa Tei | 5:25 |
| 3. | "Magic Carpet Ride" (Jazz A Delic Full mix) | | Jazz A Delic | 6:03 |
| 4. | "Peace Music (Pease Pottagemix)" | Maki Nomiya; Keitarō Takanami | Saint Etienne | 8:42 |
| 5. | "Go Go Dancer" (Super Telex mix) | | Telex | 5:12 |
| 6. | "Flower Drum Song (Satoshi's Lament)" | | Satoshi Tomiie | 7:58 |
| 7. | "Thank You" (Playground mix) | | Chapter and the Verse | 4:57 |
| 8. | "Twiggy Twiggy" (Take the TB Train mix) | Nanako Sato | Tackq Ishino | 7:47 |
| 9. | "Tout va bien (Banji-Jump from Corcovado)" | | Tei; Tomiie | 3:29 |
| Total length: | | | | 50:08 |

== Charts ==
| Chart (1993) | Peak position |
|---|---|
| Japanese Albums (Oricon) | 30 |
