= Yukari Fresh =

Japanese musician

- Origin: Tokyo, Japan
- Genres: Shibuya-kei, Pop, J-Pop
- Years active: 1997–present
- Label: Escalator Records
- Members: Yukari Fresh (Yukari Takasaki, ゆかり 高崎)
- Website: Official Escalator Records Website (Archived), Myspace (Archived)

Yukari Takasaki (高崎ゆかり), known professionally as Yukari Fresh, is a Japanese Shibuya-kei musician. She briefly adopted the moniker of Yukari Rotten in 2004.

== Beginnings ==
Takasaki was one of seventeen members of Tokyo's Escalator Records' first bands, Snapshot. The duo (Takasaki and her current husband, Yugo Katayama) released several singles and EPs, but turned to solo and other collaborative work in the later mid-90s.

== Solo debut ==
Takasaki debuted in 1997 with Yukari's Perfect! on Escalator Records. The record featured such guests as Hideki Kaji and the Genbeat. The poppy, whimsical record gained the attention of Shibuya-kei artists (Cornelius, Kahimi Karie, and other early Shibuya-kei artists) and Germany's Bungalow Records (the label which pressed a split single with Stereo Total later in 1997), even though Takasaki was still a newcomer to the solo music scene. Takasaki was asked to contribute to the 1998 Sushi 4004 compilation, a compilation which featured other Shibuya-kei artists of repute such as Kahimi Karie, Takako Minekawa, Fantastic Plastic Machine, and Yoshinori Sunahara. The compilation introduced listeners to the world of J pop, and the Shibuya-kei scene.

== Middle period ==
Takasaki's debut was followed shortly by a mini-album called Cook Some Dishes. The album is actually a mix of shortened versions of many of the artist's songs. In January 2000, Takasaki released Cityrama, which again featured an appearance from Hideki Kaji, along with Mike Alway, Pop Tarts, and several others. Before releasing another full album, Takasaki did another mini-album, Erik, named after cyclist Erik Zabel. It was said that Erik was a more mature record, one which featured an artist who had found her place. Reviewers also commented on the glossy, more focused production qualities. February 2003 marked the release of Takasaki's third full-length album, Trefoils Hat. The album has been seen as Takasaki's most accomplished work to date in that it is her most focused piece. Takasaki's songwriterly, poppy side took precedence on this album, leaving some of the more dance-oriented disco tracks out.

In 2004, maintaining her consistently cutesy appeal, Takasaki informed the world she had changed her name to Yukari Rotten, and that punky electropop was now her sound. Not Dead, the name of the Yukari Rotten debut album, did have more punch and electroclash aesthetic about it than any of her previous works. It featured the single "C.L.I.J.S.T.E.R.S.", referencing Belgian footballer Leo Clijsters. Many of Takasaki's songs are about sports heroes, notably Michael Owen and Paul Scholes. Another track "Going To Heaven To See The Househunters & Fat Truckers If It Rains", references "Going To Heaven To See If It Rains" by the Close Lobsters.

In February 2005 (by this time, Takasaki had gone back to being Fresh), the remix album Me was released. It featured songs from all of her albums, remixed by an international crowd of admired artists. August 2008 saw the surprise release of a mini-album Grrrl, Summer Cape Kid, etc. The unusual feature of this album is that each song was recorded in one shot, unedited. Takasaki can be heard playing the drums, singing and whistling throughout. Just one month later, she followed this with two "greatest hits" albums. The first, "Flammable Tapes", contains 22 tracks previously released between 1997 and 2008. The companion album, "Instrumentally Flammable", consists of previously unreleased demos, rare edits, instrumentals and a cappella tracks.

== Current situation ==
Takasaki has kept busy over the years, recording with other artists (i.e. Fantastic Plastic Machine and Mansfield), DJing various parties, and hosting her own radio show, Radio Active Man.

== Discography ==
=== Singles ===
- 07/99 "Lost & Found"
- ??/03 "Horsey Marie"

=== Albums ===
- 1997.10.00 Yukari's Perfect!
- 1998.09.22 Cook Some Dishes
- 1999.02.00 New Year's Fresh
- 2000.01.28 Cityrama
- 2001.11.21 Erik
- 2003.02.01 Trefoils Hat
- 2004.05.19 Not Dead (Yukari Rotten)
- 2005.02.26 ME
- 2005.03.24 Twelve Plus Twelve
- 2008.08.27 Grrrl, Summer Cape Kid, etc.
- 2008.10.08 Flammable Tapes
- 2008.10.08 Instrumentally Flammable
