= Sushi 4004 =

Compilation album by Various Artists
- Released: August 25, 1998
- Genre: Shibuya-kei
- Length: 78:18
- Label: Bungalow Records

Professional ratings
Review scores
Source	Rating
Allmusic	4/5 stars

Sushi 4004 is an album of various Shibuya-kei artists compiled by Le Hammond Inferno, and released by his indie pop label Bungalow Records.

== Track listing ==
1. "Bowlers in Space" – Midnight Bowlers – 7:12
2. "You Are My Music" – Hi-Posi – 5:16
3. "S'il Vous Plait" – Fantastic Plastic Machine – 5:40
4. "2300 Hawaii" – Yoshinori Sunahara – 5:51
5. "K2" – Man From Electone – 4:14
6. "Alcohol" – Kahimi Karie – 5:51
7. "Yukarin' Disco" – Yukari Fresh – 3:26
8. "Samba De Sunny Side Up" – Collette – 4:09
9. "Lait Au Miel" – Oh! Penelope – 2:55
10. "Fantastic Cat" – Takako Minekawa – 3:59
11. "Some Kinds Of Love" – DOB – 5:06
12. "Hello Baby" – Sweet Robots Against the Machine – 2:59
13. "Tragedy Of The Softrocker" – Neil & Iraiza – 2:58
14. "Drive Music" – Qypthone – 6:13
15. "The Microdisneycal World Tour (Sean O'Hagan Mix)" – Cornelius – 5:58
16. "Lesson 3003 (Part 1)" – Pizzicato Five – 6:09
