= Bossa Nova 2001 =

Studio album by Pizzicato Five
- Released: June 1, 1993
- Genre: Shibuya-kei
- Length: 60:14
- Label: Triad
- Producer: Pizzicato Five; Keigo Oyamada

Pizzicato Five chronology
Instant Replay (1993)	Bossa Nova 2001 (1993)	Souvenir 2001 (1993)

Singles from Bossa Nova 2001
- 1. "Sweet Soul Revue" Released: April 7, 1993

Professional ratings
Review scores
Source	Rating
AllMusic	4.5/5 stars

Bossa Nova 2001 (ボサ・ノヴァ2001) is the seventh studio album by Japanese pop band Pizzicato Five. It was released on June 1, 1993 by the Nippon Columbia imprint Triad. The band co-produced the album with acquaintance and fellow Shibuya-kei artist Cornelius. Following the house music-oriented Sweet Pizzicato Five the previous year, Bossa Nova 2001 signaled a return to the band's 1960s and 1970s-influenced pop style, mixed with elements of alternative dance.

Bossa Nova 2001 is the last Pizzicato Five studio album to feature guitarist Keitarō Takanami, who quit the band in 1994. Several of the album's tracks were later featured on the band's Matador Records compilations Made in USA (1994) and The Sound of Music by Pizzicato Five (1995). Bossa Nova 2001 was reissued by Readymade Records on September 30, 2000 and March 31, 2006.

== Track listing ==
All lyrics are written by Yasuharu Konishi, except where noted.

No.	Title	Lyrics	Music	Length
1.	"Rock'n'Roll" (ロックン・ロール)		Konishi	2:41
2.	"Sweet Soul Revue" (スウィート・ソウル・レヴュー)		Konishi	5:21
3.	"Magic Carpet Ride" (マジック・カーペット・ライド)		Konishi	5:48
4.	"Groovy Is My Name" (我が名はグルーヴィー)		Konishi	3:25
5.	"Sophisticated Catchy" (ソフィスティケイテッド・キャッチー)		Konishi	2:40
6.	"Peace Music" (ピース・ミュージック)	Maki Nomiya	Keitarō Takanami	4:46
7.	"Strawberry Sleighride" (ストロベリィ・スレイランド)		Konishi	3:37
8.	"Sleeper" (スリーパー)	Nomiya	Takanami	3:58
9.	"Sweet Thursday" (優しい木曜日)		Konishi	3:43
10.	"Rain Song" (レイン・ソング)	Nomiya	Takanami	3:50
11.	"Go Go Dancer" (ゴー・ゴー・ダンサー)		Konishi	5:15
12.	"Eclipse" (皆既日食)	Takanami	Takanami	2:27
13.	"Saga" (愛の神話)	Takanami	Takanami	3:30
14.	"Hallelujah Hare Krishna" (ハレルヤ・ハレクリシュナ)	Takanami	Takanami	3:23
15.	"Playback 2001" (プレイバック2001)		Konishi; Nomiya; Keigo Oyamada	0:29
16.	"Cleopatra 2001" (クレオパトラ2001)		Oyamada	5:21
Total length:				60:14

== Charts ==
Chart (1993)	Peak position
Japanese Albums (Oricon)	7
