= The Night Is Still Young =

The Night Is Still Young may refer to:

- "The Night Is Still Young" (Billy Joel song), 1985
- "The Night Is Still Young" (Nicki Minaj song), 2015
- "The Night Is Still Young" (Sandra song), featuring Thomas Anders
- "The Night Is Still Young", a song by Pizzicato Five, featured in their 1994 album Overdose
- The Night Is Still Young, an album by Sha Na Na
- "Night Is Still Young", a song by Sagar and David Simon from the 2016 Indian film Nenu Sailaja
