= Overdose (album) =

- Outer sleeve cover

Studio album by Pizzicato Five
- Released: October 1, 1994
- Genre: Shibuya-kei
- Length: 64:12
- Label: Triad
- Producer: Yasuharu Konishi; Yukihiro Fukutomi

Pizzicato Five chronology
A Television's Workshop (1994)	Overdose (1994)	TYO: Big Hits and Jet Lags 1991–1995 (1995)

Singles from Overdose
- 1. "The Night Is Still Young" Released: December 1, 1993; 2. "Happy Sad" Released: April 21, 1994; 3. "Superstar" Released: July 21, 1994; 4. "On the Sunny Side of the Street" Released: October 21, 1994

CD case cover

Alternative cover
- 2006 reissue

Professional ratings
Review scores
Source	Rating
AllMusic	3/5 stars

Overdose (オーヴァードーズ) is the eighth studio album by Japanese pop band Pizzicato Five. The album was released on October 1, 1994 by the Nippon Columbia imprint Triad. It is their first studio album not to feature founding member Keitarō Takanami, who departed the band earlier in the year. Overdose is the first of several Pizzicato Five albums to be themed around a famous city, in this case New York. The album pays tribute to soul music, and soul singer Stevie Wonder in particular, with several songs incorporating Wonder's signature instrument, the harmonica.

Four singles were released from Overdose: "The Night Is Still Young", "Happy Sad", "Superstar" and "On the Sunny Side of the Street". The song "Airplane" was later re-recorded for the band's 1996 EP Sister Freedom Tapes as "Airplane '96". Several tracks from the album appeared on the band's 1995 compilation The Sound of Music by Pizzicato Five. Overdose was reissued by Readymade Records on September 30, 2000 and March 31, 2006.

== Track listing ==
All lyrics are written by Yasuharu Konishi, except where noted; all music is composed by Konishi, except where noted

No.	Title	Lyrics	Length
1.	"Overture"		0:17
2.	"Airplane" (エアプレイン)		5:21
3.	"Statue of Liberty" (自由の女神)	Konishi; Maki Nomiya; Takagi Kan	4:49
4.	"Readymade FM" (レディメイドＦＭ)		1:23
5.	"Happy Sad" (ハッピー・サッド)		5:10
6.	"Superstar" (スーパースター)		5:23
7.	"If I Were a Groupie" (music by Konishi and Yukihiro Fukutomi)	Konishi; Nomiya	5:00
8.	"Shopping Bag" (ショッピング・バッグ)		3:44
9.	"The Night Is Still Young" (東京は夜の七時)		10:59
10.	"Hippie Day" (ヒッピー・デイ)		3:49
11.	"The Sweetest Girl" (世界中でいちばんきれいな女の子)		6:19
12.	"Questions" (クエスチョンズ)		5:27
13.	"On the Sunny Side of the Street" (陽の当たる大通り)		6:31
Total length:			64:12

== Charts ==
Chart (1994)	Peak position
Japanese Albums (Oricon)	9
