= The International Playboy & Playgirl Record =

Studio album by Pizzicato Five
- Released: October 1, 1998
- Genre: Shibuya-kei
- Length: 57:55
- Labels: Readymade; Matador
- Producer: Yasuharu Konishi

Pizzicato Five chronology
JPN: Big Hits and Jet Lags 1994–1997 (1997)	The International Playboy & Playgirl Record (1998)	Darlin' of Discothèque (1999)

Pizzicato Five US chronology
Happy End of You (1998)	Playboy & Playgirl (1999)	The Fifth Release from Matador (2000)

Singles from The International Playboy & Playgirl Record
- 1. "I Hear a Symphony" Released: November 1, 1997; 2. "La Règle du jeu" Released: January 21, 1998; 3. "Such a Beautiful Girl Like You" Released: July 18, 1998; 4. "Week-End" Released: September 19, 1998; 5. "Playboy Playgirl" Released: November 18, 1998

Professional ratings
Review scores
Source	Rating
AllMusic	4/5 stars
The Baltimore Sun	4/4 stars
Melody Maker	5/5 stars
Pitchfork	6.1/10
Q	3/5 stars

The International Playboy & Playgirl Record (プレイボーイ プレイガール) is the eleventh studio album by Japanese pop band Pizzicato Five. The album was released on October 1, 1998 by Readymade Records. Under the title Playboy & Playgirl, it was released in the United States on April 20, 1999 by Matador Records. The International Playboy & Playgirl Record was reissued on March 31, 2006.

== Track listing ==
All lyrics are written by Yasuharu Konishi; all music is composed by Konishi, except where noted.

The International Playboy & Playgirl Record
No.	Title	Length
1.	"La Dépression" (不景気)	2:15
2.	"Rolls-Royce" (ロールスロイス)	8:14
3.	"The International Pizzicato Five Mansion" (インターナショナル・ピチカート・ファイヴ・マンション)	3:27
4.	"A New Song" (新しい歌)	4:20
5.	"Week-End" (ウィークエンド)	4:03
6.	"Magic Twin Candle Tale" (不思議なふたつのキャンドル)	5:13
7.	"Concerto" (コンチェルト)	4:29
8.	"Such a Beautiful Girl Like You" (きみみたいにきれいな女の子)	4:00
9.	"Playboy Playgirl" (プレイボーイ・プレイガール)	5:11
10.	"I Hear a Symphony" (大都会交響楽)	3:46
11.	"Drinking Wine" (テーブルにひとびんのワイン)	4:25
12.	"The Great Invitations" (華麗なる招待)	4:09
13.	"Stars" (美しい星)	4:23
Total length:		57:55

Playboy & Playgirl
No.	Title	Length
1.	"La Dépression"	2:15
2.	"Rolls-Royce"	8:14
3.	"A New Song"	4:20
4.	"Week-End"	4:03
5.	"Magic Twin Candle Tale"	5:13
6.	"Concerto"	4:29
7.	"Such a Beautiful Girl Like You"	4:00
8.	"Playboy Playgirl"	5:11
9.	"La Règle du jeu" (music by Kyōhei Tsutsumi)	3:50
10.	"I Hear a Symphony"	3:46
11.	"Drinking Wine"	4:25
12.	"The Great Invitations"	4:09
13.	"Stars"	4:23
Total length:		58:18

== Charts ==
Chart (1998)	Peak position
Japanese Albums (Oricon)	19
