= Bellissima! =

1988 album by Pizzicato Five

Studio album by Pizzicato Five
- Released: September 21, 1988
- Recorded: 1988
- Studios: Onkio Haus, LDK Studio, Zero Studio, Studio Take One, Sound Design Studio
- Genre: Shibuya-kei
- Length: 44:47
- Label: CBS/Sony
- Producers: Yasuharu Konishi; Takao Tajima; Keitarō Takanami

Pizzicato Five chronology
Couples (1987)	Bellissima! (1988)	On Her Majesty's Request (1989)

Singles from Bellissima!
- 1. "Planets" / "This Can't Be Love" Released: February 22, 2017

Professional ratings
Review scores
Source	Rating
AllMusic	3/5 stars

Bellissima! (ベリッシマ) is the second studio album by Japanese pop band Pizzicato Five. The album was released on September 21, 1988, by CBS/Sony.

On initial release, Bellissima! peaked at number 86 on the Oricon Albums Chart. It was reissued on November 1, 1995. On August 24, 2016, a remastered edition of Bellissima! was released, which reached a new peak of number 39 on the Oricon Albums Chart.

== Track listing ==
All lyrics are written by Yasuharu Konishi, except where noted.

No.	Title	Music	Length
1.	"Planets" (惑星)	Takao Tajima	4:06
2.	"Temptation Talk" (誘惑について)	Tajima	4:17
3.	"Holy Triangle" (聖三角形)	Tajima	5:38
4.	"World Standard" (ワールド・スタンダード)	Keitarō Takanami	4:18
5.	"Couples" (カップルズ)	Takanami	3:56
6.	"Sunday Impressions" (日曜日の印象)	Konishi	5:11
7.	"The Swim" (水泳)	Takanami	4:09
8.	"Seventeen" (セヴンティーン; lyrics by Tajima)	Tajima	3:50
9.	"This Can't Be Love" (これは恋ではない)	Konishi	4:48
10.	"The Work of God" (神の御業)	Konishi	4:34
Total length:			44:47

== Personnel ==
- Maki Nomiya: Vocals
- Tsutomu Nakayama: Keyboards
- Takao Tajima: Guitars, Vocals, Harmonica
- Keitarō Takanami: Guitars, Keyboards, Vocals
- Makoto Saito: Guitars
- Yasuharu Konishi: Bass, Keyboards, Vocals
- Shigeo Miyata: Drums, Percussion
- Michael Kawai: Percussion
- Yagi Nobuo: Harmonica

== Charts ==
Chart (1988)	Peak position
Japanese Albums (Oricon)	86

Chart (2016)	Peak position
Japanese Albums (Oricon)	39
Japanese Top Albums Sales (Billboard Japan)	97

== See also ==
- 1988 in Japanese music
