= Nonstop to Tokyo =

EP by Pizzicato Five
- Released: July 17, 1999
- Genre: Shibuya-kei
- Length: 25:27
- Label: Readymade
- Producer: Yasuharu Konishi

Pizzicato Five chronology
Darlin' of Discothèque (1999)	Nonstop to Tokyo (1999)	A Perfect World (1999)

Professional ratings
Review scores
Source	Rating
AllMusic	2.5/5 stars

Nonstop to Tokyo (ノンストップ・トゥ・トーキョー) is an EP by Japanese pop band Pizzicato Five, released on July 17, 1999 by Readymade Records.

== Track listing ==
All tracks are written by Yasuharu Konishi

No.	Title	Length
1.	"Nonstop to Tokyo" (ノンストップ・トゥ・トーキョー)	6:51
2.	"Room Service" (ルーム・サーヴィス)	4:28
3.	"Bossa Nova 3003" (ボサノヴァ3003)	4:39
4.	"Mademoiselle" (マドモワゼル)	5:04
5.	"Nonstop to Tokyo" (radio edit)	4:25
Total length:		25:27

== Charts ==
Chart (1999)	Peak position
Japan (Oricon)	55
