= Couples (Pizzicato Five album) =

Studio album by Pizzicato Five
- Released: April 1, 1987
- Recorded: 1987
- Genre: Shibuya-kei
- Length: 38:47
- Label: CBS/Sony
- Producer: Pizzicato Five

Pizzicato Five chronology
Couples (1987)	Bellissima! (1988)

Singles from Couples
- 1. "Seven O'Clock News" / "They All Laughed" Released: February 22, 2017

Couples (カップルズ) is the debut studio album by Japanese pop band Pizzicato Five. The album was released on April 1, 1987, by CBS/Sony.

Couples was reissued on November 1, 1995, along with an instrumental version of the album entitled A Quiet Couple. On August 24, 2016, a remastered edition of Couples was released, which peaked at number 49 on the Oricon Albums Chart.

== Critical reception ==
Trouser Press noted that "Couples often sounds like the soundtrack to a very corny '70s TV series, complete with tinkling bells, punchy brass and, of course, pizzicato strings."

== Track listing ==
All lyrics are written by Yasuharu Konishi, except where noted.

No.	Title	Music	Length
1.	"Magical Connection" (マジカル・コネクション; lyrics by John Sebastian)	Sebastian	2:46
2.	"Summertime, Summertime" (サマータイム・サマータイム)	Konishi	3:35
3.	"They All Laughed" (皆笑った)	Keitarō Takanami	3:26
4.	"Serial Stories" (連載小説)	Konishi	4:18
5.	"The Apartment" (アパートの鍵)	Takanami	3:32
6.	"What Now Our Love" (そして今でも)	Konishi	3:28
7.	"Seven O'Clock News" (七時のニュース)	Ryō Kamomiya	2:25
8.	"Odd Couple and the Others" (おかしな恋人・その他の恋人)	Kamomiya	3:38
9.	"My Blue Heaven" (憂鬱天国)	Konishi	3:36
10.	"Party Joke" (パーティー・ジョーク)	Takanami	1:54
11.	"Two Sleepy People" (眠そうな二人)	Konishi	3:05
12.	"Everytime We Say Goodbye" (いつもさようなら)	Takanami	2:44
Total length:			38:47

== Charts ==
Chart (2016)	Peak position
Japanese Albums (Oricon)	49

== See also ==
- 1987 in Japanese music
