= This Year's Girl =

This Year's Girl may refer to:

- "This Year's Girl" (song), a 1978 rock song by Elvis Costello
- This Year's Girl (album), a 1991 shibuya-kei album by Pizzicato Five
- "This Year's Girl" (Buffy the Vampire Slayer), the 15th episode of season 4 of the television show Buffy the Vampire Slayer
