= Pizzicato Five in the Mix =

Compilation album by Pizzicato Five
- Released: December 21, 2001
- Genre: Shibuya-kei
- Length: 75:49
- Label: Readymade Records

Pizzicato Five in the Mix is a 2001 Pizzicato Five album.

== Track listing ==
1. "Bloopers (Introduction)" - 0:41
2. "Baby Portable Rock - My Baby Portable Player Sound" - 3:31
3. "Flower Drum Song (Satoshi's Lament) (Remix - Satoshi Tomiie)" - 3:53
4. "Go Go Dancer" - 1:15
5. "Flying High" - 3:01
6. "Trailer Music" - 1:47
7. "Lemon Kiss" - 0:17
8. "Tout Va Bien (Banji-Jump From Corcovado) (Remix - Satoshi Tomiie, Towa Tei)" - 3:27
9. "Sweet Thursday" - 4:02
10. "What Now, My Love?" - 2:22
11. "Voyage À Tokyo" - 0:53
12. "Rock 'n' Roll" - 2:10
13. "Bossa Nova 3003" - 2:43
14. "Spellbound" - 2:30
15. "Icecream Meltin' Mellow (Marin Mix 2) (Remix - Yoshinori Sunahara)" - 6:20
16. "Sweet Soul Revue" - 2:23
17. "Triste" - 4:47
18. "Coda" - 0:33
19. "T-Fm Jingle" - 0:48
20. "It's A Beautiful Day" - 3:09
21. "Message Song" - 2:38
22. "Le Grand Tokyo" - 0:17
23. "I Hear A Symphony" - 4:16
24. "Readymade Fm" - 1:17
25. "The Night Is Still Young (Kcrw-Fm Live Take)" - 4:08
26. "Nata Di Marzo" - 1:41
27. "Tokyo Mon Amour" - 3:32
28. "Goodbye Baby & Amen" - 7:30
