= This Year's Girl (album) =

Studio album by Pizzicato Five
- Released: September 1, 1991
- Genre: Shibuya-kei
- Length: 61:06
- Language: English, Japanese
- Label: Seven Gods

Pizzicato Five chronology
Readymade Recordings (1991)	This Year's Girl (1991)	Sweet Pizzicato Five (1992)

Alternative cover
- 2006 reissue

Professional ratings
Review scores
Source	Rating
AllMusic	4.5/5 stars

This Year's Girl (女性上位時代) is the fifth studio album by Japanese pop band Pizzicato Five. It was released on September 1, 1991 by the Nippon Columbia imprint Seven Gods, serving as the band's first album for Nippon Columbia. This Year's Girl is the first Pizzicato Five album to feature Maki Nomiya as lead vocalist. On the album, the band augmented their Shibuya-kei sound with elements of alternative dance and began to more fully incorporate sampling into their music.

This Year's Girl was reissued by Readymade Records on September 30, 2000 and March 31, 2006.

== Track listing ==
All lyrics are written by Yasuharu Konishi, except where noted.

No.	Title	Lyrics	Music	Length
1.	"This Year's Girl #4" (女性上位時代#4)			1:00
2.	"I" (私のすべて)		Konishi	1:51
3.	"Ohayo" (お早よう)		Konishi	5:07
4.	"Thank You" (サンキュー)		Konishi	5:26
5.	"Let's Be Adult" (大人になりましょう)		Konishi	3:36
6.	"This Year's Girl #5" (女性上位時代#5)			0:14
7.	"Baby Love Child" (ベイビィ・ラブ・チャイルド)		Keitarō Takanami	3:42
8.	"Twiggy Twiggy" (トゥイギー・トゥイギー)	Nanako Sato	Sato	2:49
9.	"Twiggy vs. James Bond" (トゥイギー対ジェイムズ・ボンド)		Konishi	1:15
10.	"Gifted" (神様がくれたもの)	Maki Nomiya	Takanami	4:50
11.	"Party" (パーティー)	Yasushi Nakayama; Ryōko Suzuki	Haruomi Hosono	4:32
12.	"Shiritori O Suru Koibito Tachi" (しりとりをする恋人たち)		Nomiya; Haruo Kubota	4:16
13.	"Marble Index" (マーブル・インデックス)	Takanami	Takanami	3:57
14.	"Y.O.U." (きみになりたい)		Konishi	4:33
15.	"Xxxxxxxxxman" (むずかしい人)	Nomiya	Takanami	3:53
16.	"Tokyo's Coolest Sound"		Takanami	4:12
17.	"Birth of Cool" (クールの誕生)		Konishi	3:47
18.	"This Year's Girl #6" (女性上位時代#6)		Konishi; Nomiya; Kubota	2:06
Total length:				61:06

== Charts ==
Chart (1991)	Peak position
Japanese Albums (Oricon)	55
