= Darlin' of Discothèque =

EP by Pizzicato Five
- Released: April 21, 1999
- Genre: Shibuya-kei
- Length: 31:53
- Label: Readymade
- Producer: Yasuharu Konishi

Pizzicato Five chronology
The International Playboy & Playgirl Record (1998)	Darlin' of Discothèque (1999)	Nonstop to Tokyo (1999)

Professional ratings
Review scores
Source	Rating
AllMusic	4/5 stars

Darlin' of Discothèque (ダーリン・オブ・ディスコティック) is an EP by Japanese pop band Pizzicato Five, released on April 21, 1999 by Readymade Records.

== Track listing ==
All songs written by Yasuharu Konishi, except where noted.
CD (Readymade Records/Heat Wave - COCA-50068)

No.	Title	Writer(s)	Length
1.	"Darlin' of Discothèque" (ダーリン・オブ・ディスコティック)		11:30
2.	"One Two Three Four Five Six Seven Eight Nine Ten Barbie Dolls" (ワン・トゥー・スリー・フォー・ファイヴ・シックス・セヴン・エイト・ナイン・テン・バービー・ドールズ)		5:17
3.	"Tout, tout pour ma chèrie" (シェリーにくちづけ)	Michel Polnareff	4:57
4.	"Jolly Bubbly Lovely" (ジョリ・バブリ・ラヴリィ)		5:25
5.	"Darlin' of Discothèque (Radio Edit)" (ダーリン・オブ・ディスコティック (ラジオ エディット))		4:44
Total length:			31:53

Promotional double 12" single (Readymade Records - TDJH-11/12, 018)

No.	Title	Writer(s)	Length
1.	"Darlin' of Discothèque"		11:30
2.	"One Two Three Four Five Six Seven Eight Nine Ten Barbie Dolls"		5:17
3.	"Tout, tout pour ma chèrie"	Michel Polnareff	4:57
4.	"Jolly Bubbly Lovely"		5:25
5.	"Tout, tout pour ma chèrie (Alternate Cut)"	Michel Polnareff	4:57
6.	"Darlin' of Discothèque (DUB)"		11:30
Total length:			43:36

== Charts ==
Chart (1999)	Peak position
Japan (Oricon)	38
