= Romantique 96 =

Studio album by Pizzicato Five
- Released: September 30, 1995
- Genre: Shibuya-kei
- Length: 60:36
- Label: Triad
- Producer: Yasuharu Konishi; Yukihiro Fukutomi; Tomoyuki Tanaka; Towa Tei

Pizzicato Five chronology
Antique 96 (1995)	Romantique 96 (1995)	Sister Freedom Tapes (1996)

Singles from Romantique 96
- 1. "Triste" Released: October 21, 1995

Professional ratings
Review scores
Source	Rating
AllMusic	4/5 stars

Romantique 96 (ロマンティーク96) is the ninth studio album by Japanese pop band Pizzicato Five. It was released on September 30, 1995 by the Nippon Columbia imprint Triad. The album is highly inspired by 1960s French cinema and music. It was reissued by Readymade Records on September 30, 2000 and March 31, 2006.

== Track listing ==
All lyrics are written by Yasuharu Konishi, except where noted; all music is composed by Konishi, except where noted

No.	Title	Lyrics	Music	Length
1.	"Potpourri" (ポプリ)			1:29
2.	"The Awakening" (めざめ)			2:34
3.	"Welcome to the Circus" (世界でいちばんファンキーなバンド)			5:46
4.	"Flying High" (ジェット機のハウス)		Tomoyuki Tanaka	5:07
5.	"Romantique 96"			0:37
6.	"Icecream Meltin' Mellow" (アイスクリーム・メルティン・メロウ)			6:39
7.	"The Sound of Music" (サウンド・オヴ・ミュージック)			4:09
8.	"Contact" (コンタクト)	Konishi; Serge Gainsbourg	Gainsbourg	4:23
9.	"Nata di marzo" (三月生まれ)			2:55
10.	"The Secret Garden" (秘密の花園)			6:13
11.	"Catwalk" (キャットウォーク)			5:02
12.	"Good"	Chica Sato	Hajime Tachibana	3:59
13.	"Variation" (変奏曲)			0:21
14.	"Tokyo, mon amour" (トウキョウ・モナムール)			5:51
15.	"Triste" (悲しい歌)			4:52
16.	"Coda" (コーダ)			0:39
Total length:				60:36

== Charts ==
Chart (1995)	Peak position
Japanese Albums (Oricon)	10
