= Sweet Pizzicato Five =

- Outer sleeve cover

Studio album by Pizzicato Five
- Released: September 21, 1992
- Genre: Shibuya-kei
- Length: 55:59
- Label: Triad
- Producer: Yasuharu Konishi

Pizzicato Five chronology
This Year's Girl (1991)	Sweet Pizzicato Five (1992)	Pizzicato Free Soul (1992)

CD case cover

Alternative cover
- 2006 reissue

Professional ratings
Review scores
Source	Rating
AllMusic	2.5/5 stars

Sweet Pizzicato Five (スウィート・ピチカート・ファイヴ) is the sixth studio album by Japanese pop band Pizzicato Five. It was released on September 21, 1992 by the Nippon Columbia imprint Triad. The album marks a turn toward a more house music-influenced sound for the band.

Sweet Pizzicato Five was reissued by Readymade Records on September 30, 2000 and March 31, 2006.

== Track listing ==
All lyrics are written by Yasuharu Konishi, except where noted; all music is composed by Konishi, except where noted

No.	Title	Lyrics	Music	Length
1.	"Tout va bien" (万事快調)			6:54
2.	"Flower Drum Song" (フラワー・ドラム・ソング)			7:58
3.	"Catchy" (キャッチー)			7:15
4.	"Telepathy" (テレパシー)			6:53
5.	"Shock Treatment" (ショック療法)	Maki Nomiya; Keitarō Takanami	Takanami	5:31
6.	"CDJ"			1:21
7.	"KDD" (パリコレ)	Nomiya	Takanami	7:36
8.	"Funky Lovechild" (ファンキー・ラヴチャイルド)		Konishi; Takanami	6:21
9.	"Cosmic Blues" (コズミック・ブルース)		Takanami	6:10
Total length:				55:59

== Charts ==
Chart (1992)	Peak position
Japanese Albums (Oricon)	50
