= Nanako Sato =

Japanese musician

Nanako Sato 佐藤 奈々子
- Also known as: Nanaco
- Born: 1957; Nakano, Tokyo, Japan
- Genres: City pop
- Occupations: Singer; photographer; lyricist
- Instrument: Vocals
- Years active: 1977–present
- Labels: Nippon Columbia; Victor Entertainment

Nanako Sato (Japanese: 佐藤 奈々子, Hepburn: Satō Nanako; born 1955) is a Japanese musician. Originally a competitive gymnast during her youth before an accident, she worked as a solo singer for Nippon Columbia and Victor Entertainment, releasing five solo albums with both labels. She also worked as a commercial photographer in the 1980s, before returning to releasing music in 1995. She is among several artists who have been associated with city pop, with her music appearing in several city pop compilations.

== Biography ==
Nanako Sato was born in 1955 in Nakano, Tokyo. Her aunt was an Olympic gymnast and she began training in the sport as a toddler; she also competed in the Inter-High School Championships before retiring after falling headfirst onto a bar and being unconscious for a week. She was educated at Keio University, where she graduated from the Faculty of Letters in 1978.

While attending Keio, she debuted as a solo singer with her debut album Funny Walkin' released in 1977. She later released four more solo albums: Sweet Swingin' (1977), Pillow Talk (1978), Kissing Fish (1979), and Spy (1980). Originally assigned to Nippon Columbia, she moved to Victor Entertainment in 1980. She was a founding member of new wave band Spy, which she founded that same year. She was also a lyricist for other musicians like Anli, Maki Nomiya, and Pizzicato Five.

In addition to her singing career, Sato started working as a commercial photographer in the early-1980s, particularly in advertising, magazines, and music covers. Her repertoire as a photographer includes releases from Cocco and Haruomi Hosono. She has also worked as a narrator for commercials, including at Asahi Kasei's Heber Haus campaign. From 1987 to 1993, she lived in Paris.

In February 1995, Sato released her first album in over a decade, Fear and Loving. Her album Love is a Drug was released in 1996, with same-day releases in the United Kingdom and United States in addition to Japan. She later released more albums: Luminous Love in 23 (1998), Sisters on the Riverbed (2000; produced by Mark Bingham), and Old Angel (2013). In 2014, she released a self-cover of "Twiggy Twiggy", which she wrote for Nomiya before it was covered by Pizzicato Five. In July 2017, Sato's first in-store event was held at Tower Records Shibuya. She performed "Hana no Yoru", the theme song of Shiro Maeda's 2018 film Kako: My Sullen Past. In June 2018, she released Golden Remedy, an album where she collaborated with Riki Hidaka. In 2022, she released a studio live album with Moonriders, Radio Moon and Roses 1979Hz.

Sato's music has been associated with the city pop wave of the 2010s and 2020s. Her song "Subterranean Futari Bocci" appeared on the 2019 city pop compilation Pacific Breeze: Japanese City Pop, AOR and Boogie 1976–1986; Jillian Mapes of Pitchfork described Sato as "honey-voiced" and said that the song "might make you feel as though it’s time to come on down, you’re the next contestant on The Price Is Right". That same song later appeared in the 2026 album City Pop Story: Urban & Ocean. Her album Funny Walkin' appeared in Hitoshi Kurimoto's 2022 book "City Pop no Kihon" ga Kono 100-mai de Wakaru!.

Sato's son Jan is the bassist for rock band Great 3.

== Discography ==
=== Original albums ===
Title	Details
Funny Walkin'	Released: 25 June 1977; Label: Nippon Columbia
Sweet Swingin'	Released: 25 December 1977; Label: Nippon Columbia
Pillow Talk	Released: 25 October 1978; Label: Nippon Columbia
Kissing Fish	Released: 25 July 1979; Label: Nippon Columbia
Spy	Released: 21 October 1980; Label: Victor Entertainment
Fear and Loving	Released: 21 January 1995; Label: Nippon Columbia
Love is a Drug	Released: 24 July 1996; Label: Nippon Columbia
Luminus Love in 23	Released: 25 March 1999; Label: Bella Union
Sisters on the Riverbed	Released: 25 July 2001
Old Angel (with Camera = Man'nenhitsu)	Released: 2013; Label: Bella Union
Radio Moon and Roses 1979Hz (with Moonriders)	Released: 3 August 2022; Label: Nippon Columbia

=== Best-of albums ===
Title	Details
Tears of Angel	Released: 1 September 1988; Label: Nippon Columbia
Nanako Sato	Released: 21 November 1991; Label: Nippon Columbia
