= Pizzicato Five =

Japanese pop band

- Pizzicato Five members Maki Nomiya and Yasuharu Konishi in 2001

Background information
- Also known as: Pizzicato V; P5
- Origin: Tokyo, Japan
- Genres: Shibuya-kei; J-pop
- Years active: 1984–2001
- Labels: Teichiku; Sony; Nippon Columbia; Matador
- Past members: Yasuharu Konishi; Keitarō Takanami; Ryō Kamomiya; Mamiko Sasaki; Takao Tajima; Maki Nomiya

Pizzicato Five (formerly typeset as Pizzicato V and sometimes abbreviated to P5) was a Japanese pop band formed in Tokyo in 1984 by multi-instrumentalists Yasuharu Konishi and Keitarō Takanami. While it began as a quintet, after personnel changes in the late 1980s the band gained international fame as a duo consisting of Konishi and vocalist Maki Nomiya. With their music blending together 1960s pop, jazz and synth-pop, the group were a prominent component in the Shibuya-kei movement of the 1990s.

Pizzicato Five was a prolific group during its existence, usually releasing at least a studio album each year in addition to various EPs and remix albums. Their music has appeared in numerous movies, television episodes, and video games. The English version of their 1991 song "Baby Love Child" was featured in the Futurama episode "Leela's Homeworld".

== History ==
=== 1980s ===
Pizzicato V began in 1984 when university students Yasuharu Konishi and Keitarō Takanami first met at a local music society conference. Ryō Kamomiya, Mamiko Sasaki, and Shigeo Miyata were soon recruited after a few years. Miyata left the group almost immediately but the four remaining members kept the name Pizzicato V. The band released its first single on Haruomi Hosono's Non-Standard label (Teichiku Records), a 12-inch release titled "The Audrey Hepburn Complex" which was produced by Hosono, in 1985. They followed this with the single "Action".

In 1986, Pizzicato V signed with CBS/Sony (now Sony Music Entertainment Japan). In 1987, the band released their first all-new album, Couples. It was a commercial failure, and the record company began pressuring the band to find a new lead singer. Kamomiya and Sasaki decided to quit. Takao Tajima, Original Love's frontman, joined the band soon as the new vocalist. He decided to work at these two bands. With Tajima, the band released its second album, Bellissima! in 1988.

The next two albums, 1989's On Her Majesty's Request and 1990's Soft Landing on the Moon, were also commercial failures.

=== 1990s ===
Textlogo of Pizzicato Five

In 1990, Maki Nomiya, who had previously released one solo album, joined as the third lead vocalist. Takao Tajima left to concentrate on his own band Original Love. In 1991, Pizzicato Five signed with Nippon Columbia/Seven Gods (later Triad Records).

Following three EPs showcasing Nomiya's vocals, Pizzicato Five released This Year's Girl. Inspired by the advent of sampling (De La Soul's 3 Feet High and Rising is said to have been a major influence), the group put together a sound which would help start the burgeoning Shibuya-kei scene. The album would spawn two of their best-known songs: "Twiggy Twiggy" and "Baby Love Child".

1992 saw a change in direction as the clubby Sweet Pizzicato Five was released. The band was then considered niche, despite its loyal fan base.

The band began to get increasing exposure via the theme songs it recorded for television dramas (a common practice for pop bands in Japan), achieving widespread fame with the 1993 single "Sweet Soul Revue", which was featured in a major spring advertising campaign for Kao Corporation (Kanebo Cosmetics) and as the theme song to the 1995 Pauly Shore film Jury Duty. In December, the single "The Night Is Still Young" (東京は夜の七時, tōkyō wa yoru no shichiji) (literally, 7 p.m. in Tokyo) became another smash hit after it was used as the opening theme of the children's television programme UgoUgo Rūga Ni-gō.

The band's American debut came in 1994 with the release of the EP Five by Five on Matador Records. This was quickly followed by a full-length album, Made in USA, a compilation of tracks from their last three Japanese albums which sold 200,000 copies worldwide.

Shortly before the release of the next album Overdose in the same year, Keitarō Takanami quit the band, leaving Konishi and Nomiya as the only remaining members. In February 1995, the two set off on a successful 14-stop tour of Europe and America. Another compilation, The Sound of Music by Pizzicato Five, was released in October 1995, again featuring various tracks from the Maki-era albums.

After the 1996 release of the album Romantique 96 and several singles, including the hit "Baby Portable Rock", in 1997 the band formed its own label, Readymade Records, and released the commercially successful album Happy End of the World – the only Pizzicato Five album to be released unchanged in both Japan and the rest of the world.

In the 1990s, the band achieved a degree of success in the United States.

In 1998, the band released The International Playboy & Playgirl Record in Japan. It would be released a year later worldwide with a slightly different track listing and the shortened title (which was also its Japanese title) of Playboy & Playgirl.

1999 came and Pizzicato Five released the JBL Maxisonic series of EPs, followed by the album Pizzicato Five. It included songs from each of the three EPs in very different forms: "Darlin' of Discothèque" is shorter and instrumental, "A Perfect World" is a lounge-style rearrangement sung by guest vocalist Mieko Hirota and the new song "20th Century Girl" is based on the B-side "Room Service", originally written by Masumi Arichika of TV Jesus.

=== Final years ===
In 2000, Matador Records released Pizzicato Five under the somewhat less confusing name of The Fifth Release from Matador. The CD version of this left out the first song "Love Again" but added three extra tracks (one from each of the JBL Maxisonic EPs), while the LP version shared the same title but deviated still further from the original track listing. It would also be Pizzicato Five's last American release.

2001 saw the Japanese release of the album Çà et là du Japon and the announcement that the band was to break up, followed by a series of live events featuring guest performances by old members and two further Big Hits and Jet Lags albums – Pizzicato Five R.I.P. (1998–2001) and Singles (1993–2001). Since their disbandment, the band's catalogue has been reissued as various compilations such as "Pizzicato Five On Demand".

== Members ==
Members (at time of disbandment)

- Yasuharu Konishi (1984–2001) – songwriter, bass guitar, guitar, keyboards, vocals.

He was the only founding member to stay with the group until the end. He is a music producer now.

- Maki Nomiya (1990–2001) – lead vocals

Their third vocalist. She is also a solo singer, a narrator, a fashion model and a dress designer now.

Former members

- Keitarō Takanami (1984–1994) – guitar, keyboards and vocals.

One of the founding members; he is a guitarist and a music producer now. He changed the spelling of his name to 高浪敬太郎 later, and was also known as "K-taro."

- Mamiko Sasaki (1984–1987) – lead vocals

One of the original members and was the first vocalist of this group.

- Ryō Kamomiya (1984–1987) – keyboards

One of the original members; he is a composer and an arranger now.

- Takao Tajima (1987–1990) – lead vocal, guitar, harmonica

Their second vocalist. He had already come out as Original Love's vocalist at the time. He is a solo singer and is also a music producer now.

Timeline

== Discography ==
Studio albums

- Couples (1987)
- Bellissima! (1988)
- On Her Majesty's Request (1989)
- Soft Landing on the Moon (1990)
- This Year's Girl (1991)
- Sweet Pizzicato Five (1992)
- Bossa Nova 2001 (1993)
- Overdose (1994)
- Romantique 96 (1995)
- Happy End of the World (1997)
- The International Playboy & Playgirl Record (1998)
- Pizzicato Five (1999)
- Çà et là du Japon (2001)
