= Maki Nomiya =

Japanese singer and musician (born 1960)

Maki Nomiya 野宮 真貴
- Born: March 12, 1960 (age 66); Onbetsu, Hokkaido, Japan
- Genre: Shibuya-kei
- Years active: 1980–present
- Labels: FlyingDog; Columbia Music Entertainment; Rhythm Zone; Sony Music Associated Records; Universal Classics & Jazz; Speedstar
- Website: Cahier de la Mode

Maki Nomiya (Japanese: 野宮 真貴, Hepburn: Nomiya Maki; born March 12, 1960) is a Japanese singer and musician. She is known as the "Queen of Shibuya-kei" (渋谷系の女王, Shibuya-kei no Joō). Maki released her first solo album in 1981, and worked through the 1980s as the lead vocalist of the new wave band Portable Rock. In 1991, she became the lead singer of the band Pizzicato Five. When the group disbanded in 2001, she embarked on a solo career. She also appears singing solo on the soundtrack of the game We Love Katamari and in the 2008 Japanese version of Just One Second (Jikan Wo Tomete) by London Elektricity.

== Solo discography ==
- 1981: Pink no Kokoro (Pink Heart)
- 2000: Miss Maki Nomiya Sings
- 2002: Lady Miss Warp
- 2004: Dress Code
- 2005: Big Bang Romance EP (a/k/a Maki Nomiya Loves M-Flo) (with M-Flo)
- 2005: Party People
- 2009: Maki-Takai No Jetlag (with Fernanda Takai)
- 2012: 30 Greatest Self Covers & More!!!
- 2014: Miss Maki Nomiya Sings Shibuya-kei Standards
- 2015: What the World Needs Now Is Love
- 2016: Un homme et une femme
- 2017: Vacances Shibuya-kei wo Utau – Wonderful Summer
- 2022: New Beautiful
- 2022: "Sweet Soul Revue" (with Rainych)

== Filmography ==
- Akiramemasen! (2027)
