= Yasuharu Konishi =

Japanese musician, composer and DJ (born 1959)

Yasuharu Konishi 小西 康陽
- Born: February 3, 1959 (age 67); Sapporo, Hokkaido, Japan
- Genres: Shibuya-kei
- Occupation: Music producer

Yasuharu Konishi (小西 康陽, Konishi Yasuharu; born February 3, 1959) is a Japanese musician, composer and DJ. He was a founding member of Pizzicato Five and the only such to stay with the group until its breakup in 2001. Konishi's current activities are through his company readymade entertainment and his record label 524 records (a play on words from Konishi's name, as the numbers 524 can be read ko-ni-shi in Japanese using goroawase).

== Collaboration ==
Konishi is a prolific producer, composer, arranger and remixer. He has written, produced and arranged in collaboration with many artists, such as Unicorn, Towa Tei, Mari Natsuki, Cornelius, Yumi Yoshimura of Puffy AmiYumi, Alisa Mizuki, Akiko Wada, SMAP and Mika Nakashima.

Konishi's remixes are featured in a far greater range of recordings. In addition to remixing individual tracks for a wide variety of artists for inclusion in their own releases, Konishi has been a prominent figure in several remix-only projects. Some of these have centered on music from cartoons, such as Lupin III and Astro Boy. Others have focused on specific artists, such as James Brown and Tom Jones.

In 2003, he introduced Franco-English pop singer-songwriter MeeK to the Japanese public by writing an introductory essay on MeeK's debut album Psychotique, released on the Indie Tokyo record label MINF.

== Other projects ==
Konishi produced a video game called Beatmania – The Sound of Tokyo, for Konami's long running Bemani series. In 2009, he was responsible for the music and music direction of Talk Like Singing, a musical starring Shingo Katori of SMAP, that made its world premiere in New York City.
