= Shibuya-kei =

Japanese pop music genre

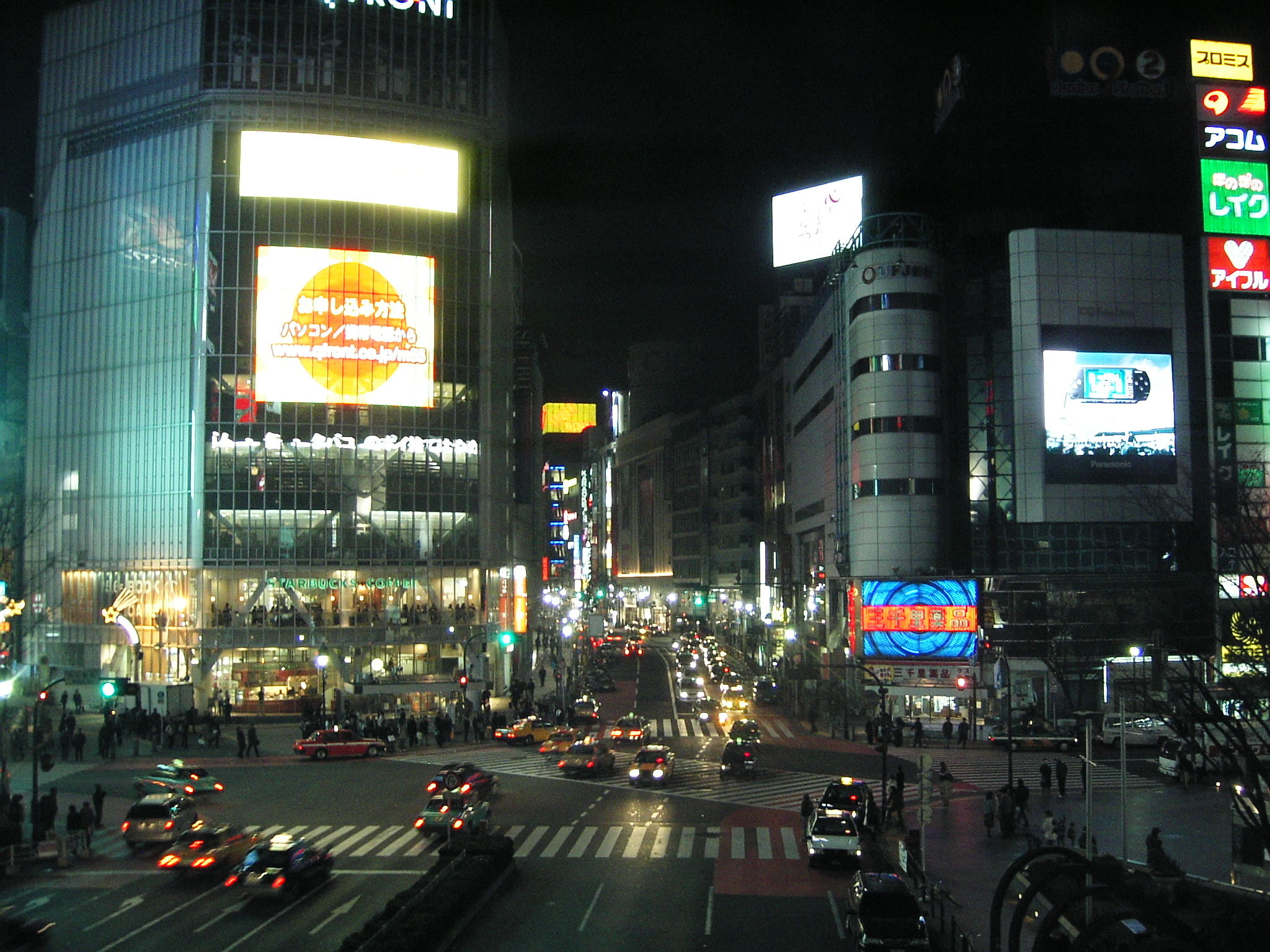
- Shibuya Crossing in 2005
- Native name: 渋谷系
- Etymology: lit. "Shibuya style", c. 1993
- Other names: Shibuya sound
- Stylistic origins: Indie pop; J-pop; rare grooves; orchestral pop; lounge; sunshine pop; Brill Building; girl groups; yé-yé; psychedelia; Madchester; hip hop; house; soul; jazz; funk; bossa nova; electronic; city pop; Italian soundtracks
- Cultural origins: Late 1980s – early 1990s, Shibuya, Tokyo, Japan

Subgenres
- Future pop; neo-Shibuya-kei; post-Shibuya-kei

Fusion genres
- Akishibu-kei; pico-pico

Shibuya-kei (Japanese: 渋谷系; lit. "Shibuya style", also called the Shibuya sound) is a Japanese music subculture and microgenre that originated in Tokyo in the late 1980s and early 1990s. It began as an indie scene encompassing pop musicians who incorporated disparate Western influences, drawing especially from 1960s pop, indie pop, and rare grooves. The term mainly refers to the shared artistic sensibilities between these musicians, who were typically dissimilar in sound, employed quotation and sampling extensively, and were inspired by earlier genres that used kitsch, fusion, and artifice.

Coinciding with the Japanese asset price bubble and emergence of J-pop, the term was originally applied around 1993 to acts whose record sales were largely driven by affluent youth in Tokyo's Shibuya ward, which hosted shops with an exceptional stock of out-of-print imports from the West. Led by Flipper's Guitar and Pizzicato Five, acts frequently collaborated within the scene and, in their music videos and record artwork, adopted fashion and graphics that drew on British mod, Italian cinema, op-art, French new wave, and retro-futurism. Shibuya-kei reached its critical and commercial peak in the mid- to late 1990s, a period in which it crossed over with indie rock, noise pop, downtempo, electronic dance music, and reggae, among other genres. It popularized many Western music styles in Japan, including sunshine pop, yé-yé, hip hop, and Madchester, and contributed to the development of modern J-pop.

Record sales and interest within the scene waned after its general aesthetic was absorbed into the Japanese mainstream, the original artists and groups pursued different styles or disbanded, and its cultural prominence was displaced by idol groups and the Akiba-kei gaming and anime subculture. After the 1990s, it was followed by artists categorized as post-Shibuya-kei, which comprised acts who had been outsider contemporaries of the original scene, neo-Shibuya-kei, a movement led by Capsule, and pico-pico, an electropop variant named from the Japanese onomatopoeia for chiptune. The 2000s saw numerous anime soundtracks adopting the Shibuya sound, a trend later dubbed Akishibu-kei.

== Etymology ==
Shibuya-kei (lit. "Shibuya style") is a music subculture and microgenre that developed from the Shibuya ward of Tokyo, a center of youth culture, fashion, and nightlife known for its concentration of fashionable restaurants, bars, record shops, and bookshops. A common misconception holds that the name reflected Shibuya's status as a fashionable neighborhood; according to scholar W. David Marx, young residents had by then moved from Harajuku designer fashion toward a casual style known as shibu-kaji. Scholar Anne McKnight writes that the term described "an atmosphere" delineated from the mainstream kayōkyoku industry and rooted in a 1970s-era "musical infrastructure ... underwritten by an urban street culture of design, public space and commerce".

Although Shibuya-kei is usually described as a music genre, most of the leading acts were not formed in Shibuya and there was no clear consensus on the definition and musical criteria during the movement's 1990s peak. The term's adoption coincided with that of "J-pop", itself created in the late 1980s by the FM radio station J-Wave to categorize native music that incorporated Western styles. The media initially applied the "Shibuya-kei" label to several acts who achieved Oricon chart success through sales at HMV Shibuya, Tower Records, and Wave, among them Flipper's Guitar, Scha Dara Parr, Pizzicato Five, and Love Tambourines, who had no formal association and shared no common sound. Their music was sometimes categorized as yogaku, a Japanese term for Western music styles performed by Japanese, and Shibuya's record stores accounted for more than half of their sales. (Note: Sabukaru magazine contributor Leonel Martinez contends that the term more accurately describes "a cultural movement" that coalesced around Shibuya music clubs and "encompassed not only the musical exponents of the time and their production techniques, but also the listeners, their cultural resources, the diffusion of knowledge among them and their methods of music consumption.")

The exact origin of the phrase "Shibuya-kei" is not definitively known; it was first used in promotional materials by stores like HMV and Wave in 1993 and possibly inspired by the 1992 appearance of visual-kei. (Note: McKnight states the term had been commonly applied to indie acts such as Pizzicato Five, Original Love, and Cornelius, and that its usage "crystallized" circa 1993. Observer contributor Justin Joffe wrote that Shibuya-kei initially referred to "Japanese retail music from the Shibuya district" and functioned as "a sort of slang for a regional style", whereas A.V. Club contributor Joshua Alston called the label "a prime example of the hysteria born of music journalists' gold-fever approach to discovering emerging movements.") The earliest known appearance of the phrase "Shibuya-kei" in mainstream Japanese media was in a November 1993 Apo magazine article by Jiro Yamazaki, titled "What is Shibuya-kei, the music of downtown?" Yamazaki, later attributing the term to the magazine's editors, wrote that the movement owed much to "the success of Flipper's Guitar in the late '80s, including its commercial, methodological and tremendous influence on the younger generation", and cited 1993 releases by Pizzicato Five, Keigo Oyamada (also known as Cornelius), Kenji Ozawa, and Original Love as representative examples. (Note: In 1991, HMV Shibuya opened a J-pop corner that used displays and leaflets to highlight indie records. According to scholar Koji Onishi, one of these displays coined the term "Shibuya-kei".) Subsequently, the branding came to cover a generation of Japanese indie pop acts that followed those original groups.

== Record culture and milieu ==
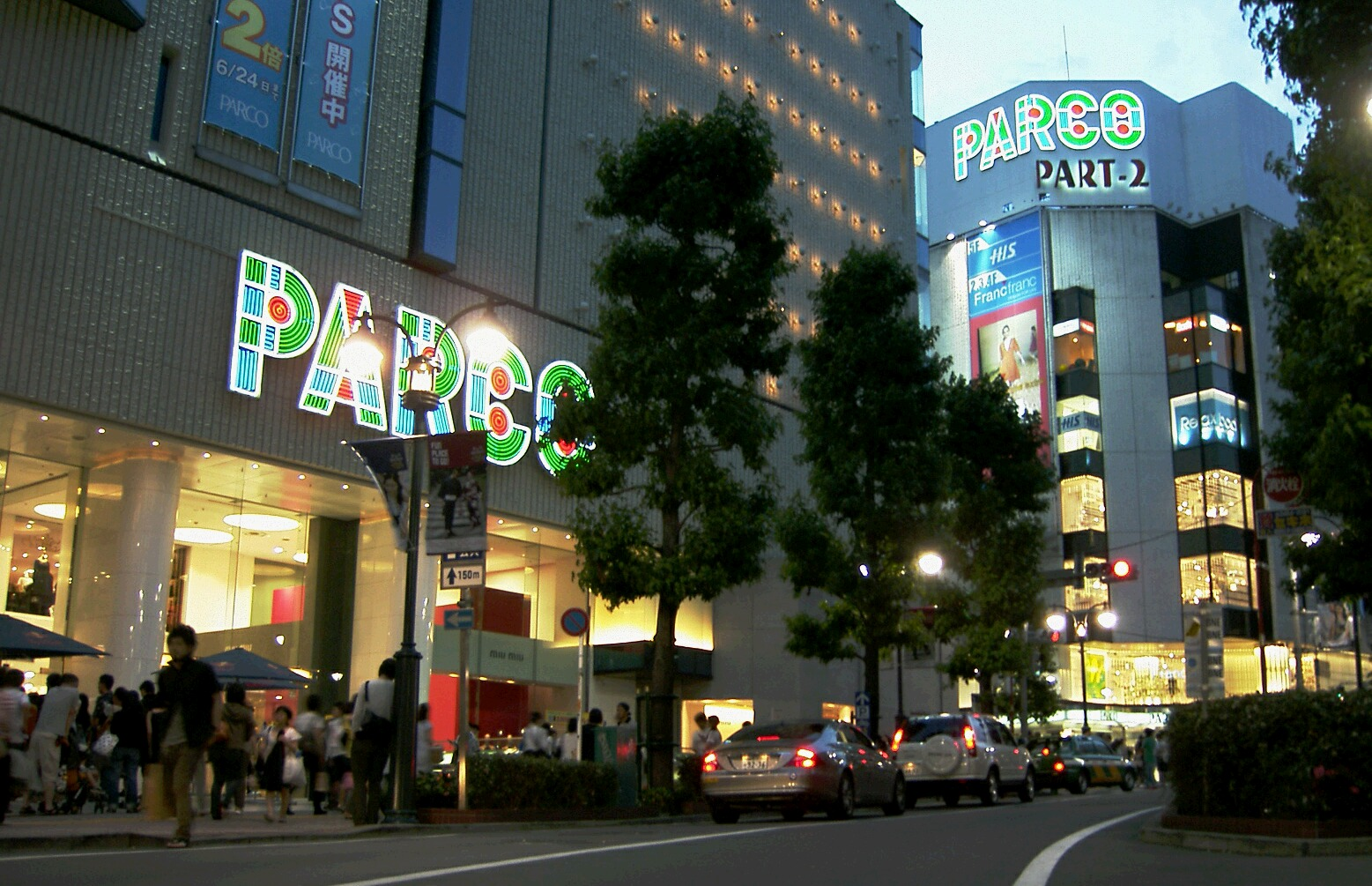
Shibuya's Parco department store complex in 2007

The development of Shibuya as a cultural hub had followed the opening of the Parco department store complex in 1973, which hosted art exhibitions, designer stores, and gathering spaces in the Udagawachō district. The complex also housed an Afternoon Tea store that led to the establishment of similar European-style cafés in the area, and the music programming in Parco's cafés included jazz, nouvelle vague, and yé-yé, elements of which later formed part of the genre's foundation. Earlier music venues in Shibuya included rock-oriented bars such as Black Hawk, which centered on singer-songwriter music, known in Japan as "human songs" and primarily distributed by the Yamaha Music store in Shibuya's Dōgenzaka district.

During the 1980s, Shibuya's retail record culture expanded as imports became easier to acquire due to the nascent economic boom. Established by Yamaha Music employee Masao Hirakawa in 1980, Manhattan Records focused on selling out-of-print American pop and rock records, such as those by the Beach Boys and Phil Spector. The store actively promoted record-collecting culture and maintained lower prices, a model subsequently followed by many other record shops. Later in the decade, Manhattan Records shifted its focus to hip-hop, selling records by artists such as Afrika Bambaata, the Sugar Hill Gang and Grandmaster Flash & the Furious Five. Many record stores were established within close proximity of Shibuya Station and numerous import shops proliferated in Udagawachō, where genres like hip-hop, jazz, and soul gained popularity. (Note: In 1982, Hirakawa had founded the All-Japan Record Festival, held near Shibuya Station and attended by shop owners from Osaka and Kyūshū. Manhattan Records ultimately relocated to Udagawachō in 1991.)

After the mid‑1980s, the neo-acoustic scene flourished, numerous independent labels were founded, flexi discs promoting new groups were distributed through magazines, and event line‑ups paired DJs with live bands. Jazz cafés (kissa) transitioned into new live music venues, which contributed to a flâneur culture. Further expansions to the Parco complex included Club Quattro, a venue later associated with Shibuya-kei acts, and the Wave record store, frequented by local DJs and musicians. By the 1990s, Japan was exceptional for maintaining a vast archive of Western music in print, a trend that culminated with hundreds of record stores in Shibuya, many located in the Noah Shibuya Building (or "Records Building"). (Note: Udagawachō was later certified by the Guinness Book as the city with the most record stores in the world.) HMV Shibuya opened in 1990, in the ONE-OH-NINE building, before relocating to Center-gai in 1998. Tower Records sold discounted imports of mainstream acts; Zest and Maximum Joy were favored for harder-to-find releases.

Shibuya in the '90s is just like Haight-Ashbury in the '60s. The young people there are always thinking about how to be cool.

— Pizzicato Five founding member Yasuharu Konishi, 1996

The original wave of Shibuya-kei artists encompassed Shinjinrui ("new generation"), a demographic that reached adolescence during the 1980s, when Western cultural influence in Japan intensified. They avoided both mainstream pop imitation and an overtly confrontational underground stance, and aimed instead for a position of cultural prestige comparable to their Western reference points. Among music enthusiasts in Japan, stylistic authenticity was derived from careful attention to detail and the amount of consumer effort applied by a fan becoming a musician. This focus on detail, combined with the consumer spending spurred by the economic boom, nurtured a movement tied to artists like Oyamada, Kahimi Karie, Buffalo Daughter, and Fantastic Plastic Machine.

Early Shibuya-kei fans were typically affluent high school students who were anti-major label (anchi-meijaa) and adopted Flipper's Guitar's aesthetic as a marker of cultural distinction from the mainstream. The phenomenon demonstrated that the success of Shibuya-kei acts could be driven without major-label endorsement or television promotion. A significant portion of the audience overlapped with the readership of the women's fashion magazine Olive, who were not previously consumers of vinyl records. CDJournal editors later compared the scene to a punk movement and 1960s Swinging London. (Note: Writing in 2014, journalist Barry Walters characterized early fans as "the '90s Japanese forerunner of today's hipster" whose endorsement of a selection of "largely independent bands and singers" preceded the invention of the "Shibuya-kei" label. According to musicologist Simon Reynolds, the affluent youth who frequented these stores created music that reflected their curated tastes, subsequently known as "Shibuya-kei".)

== Characteristics and influences ==
=== Musical ===
Many Shibuya-kei artists employed a cut-and-paste style inspired by earlier genres that used kitsch, fusion, and artifice. Tokyo Weekender contributor Ed Cunningham writes that while the genre could be reduced to "Japanese indie pop", a more comprehensive definition encompasses the artistic sensibilities "shared by a select group of artists within a brief time period" whose individual styles were too varied to be retrospectively consolidated into a single coherent style. (Note: AllMusic categorized Shibuya-kei as a pop genre that reinterpreted "classic Western pop" through a Japanese framework and described it as "pop music at its cutest" and an evolved form of 1960s girl-group-era "sweetness and simplicity". LA Weekly writer Liz Ohanesian called it a "'90s-centric" and typically electronic-based form of indie pop.) According to musicologist Mori Yoshitaka, leading Shibuya groups created "eclectically fashionable hybrid music" from global musical resources through quoting, sampling, mixing, and dubbing in a manner "that might be identified as postmodernist".

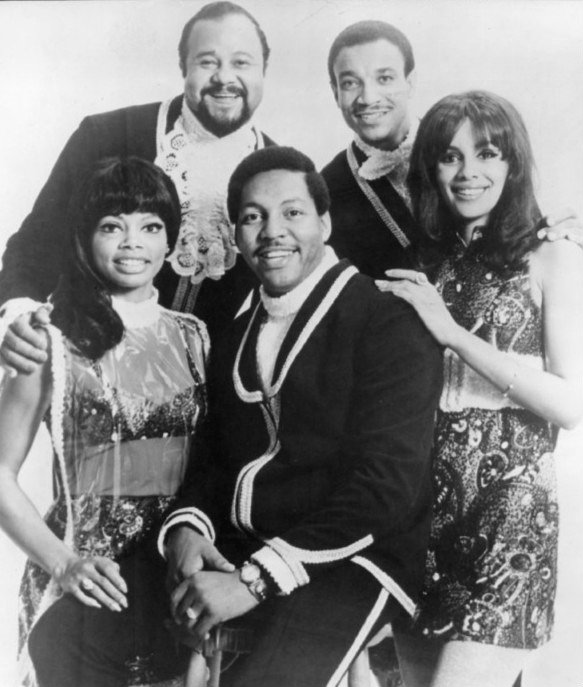
Sunshine pop acts of the 1960s were among central influences on many musicians associated with Shibuya-kei (pictured: the 5th Dimension)

The movement drew on non-Japanese source material without reference to indigenous Japanese traditions, described by Marx as an "all-inclusive bricolage [organized] under a rubric of sixties retro-future Internationalism". (Note: Marx described the sonic palette as drawing from "California '60s soft rock and psych pop, French Ye-Ye, Chicago house, East Coast hip-hop sampling, krautrock, Scottish anorak pop, Madchester club beats, Brazilian bossa nova, Italian film soundtracks and any other internationalist, retro-futurist genres.") In the assessment of musicologist Simon Reynolds, Shibuya-kei was "something like the nineties pop equivalent of the International style in architecture and design" with a "taste map" that leaned into "dainty", "sprightly", "blithe", and near-"anodyne" styles, citing 1960s French pop, Italian film soundtracks, bossa nova, and, especially, sunshine pop acts such as Roger Nichols and the Small Circle of Friends. Red Bull Music Academy contributor Barry Walters described Shibuya-kei as "an omnivorous fusion of vanguard pop, jazz, lounge, bossa nova, yé-yé, Brill Building girl groups, and West Coast harmony acts"; among the 1960s reference points, he specified Spector's Wall of Sound and girl-group productions, Burt Bacharach's musical complexity and "cool" image, Brian Wilson's experimental studio recordings with the Beach Boys, the 5th Dimension's general aesthetic, Astrud and João Gilberto's recording of "The Girl from Ipanema", Serge Gainsbourg's 1971 album Histoire de Melody Nelson, and Claudine Longet's "breathy delivery". (Note: Far Out magazine contributor Reuben Cross referred to the movement as partly a sunshine pop revival "heavily influenced by the maximalist and vibrant pop music produced by the likes of Burt Bacharach, Brian Wilson and Phil Spector" while incorporating influences from electronic music. Justin Joffe wrote that Shibuya-kei incorporated "Brazilian bossa nova", "French yé-yé lounge-pop" associated with Gainsbourg, and orchestral pop associated with Wilson and Van Dyke Parks, and that these elements were treated through a "purely Japanese" approach to sound and instrumental arrangement.)

It's about the act of so-called "digging." Pizzicato Five has excavated and reused [music] repeatedly. They admit it. Flipper's Guitar doesn't say much about it, but it doesn't change the point of having a [musical] base material.

— DJ and producer Yukihiro Fukutomi

Associated musicians preferred having their song catalogues reflect their personal tastes over developing an original sound and sourced much inspiration from "rare grooves", a term for relatively obscure recordings across genres such as jazz, funk, soul, disco, R&B, yé-yé, house, and jungle. Marx described Shibuya-kei as being "literally built" from a "collection process" where the creative content was primarily curation: "they basically reproduced their favourite songs, changing the melody a bit but keeping all parts of the production intact." Some acts within the movement employed sampling and were influenced by DJs who combined jazz with hip-hop beats; acid jazz, for example, was popular in Tokyo clubs such as Inkstick and Quattro Club and within the work of acts like Pizzicato Five and United Future Organization. Larry Heard's reconfiguration of Philadelphia soul was another common touchstone, particularly for house-oriented Shibuya-kei tracks.

French musician Louis Philippe achieved a cult following in Japan through his work with the English independent label él Records in the 1980s. He later attributed the label's popularity in Shibuya to its "light, poppy and colourful" aesthetic, writing that the developing "shibuya-kei sound had Tokyoite foundations – Pizzicato V, obviously – but also owed a lot to us". From Scotland, noise pop band the Jesus and Mary Chain, as well as independent label Postcard and the indie pop it inspired, were additional major influences, as was a style Japanese audiences termed "funk-a-latina", exemplified by acts such as Haircut 100, Blue Rondo à la Turk, and Matt Bianco. Les Inrockuptibles writer Christophe Conte characterized the scene in 1997 as "systematic copying of fleeting English trends — noisy, baggy, acid-jazz, Britpop, easy-listening", with a "fantastical New Wave ideal of Courrèges dresses, Anna Karina hairstyles, and melancholic yé-yé poses."

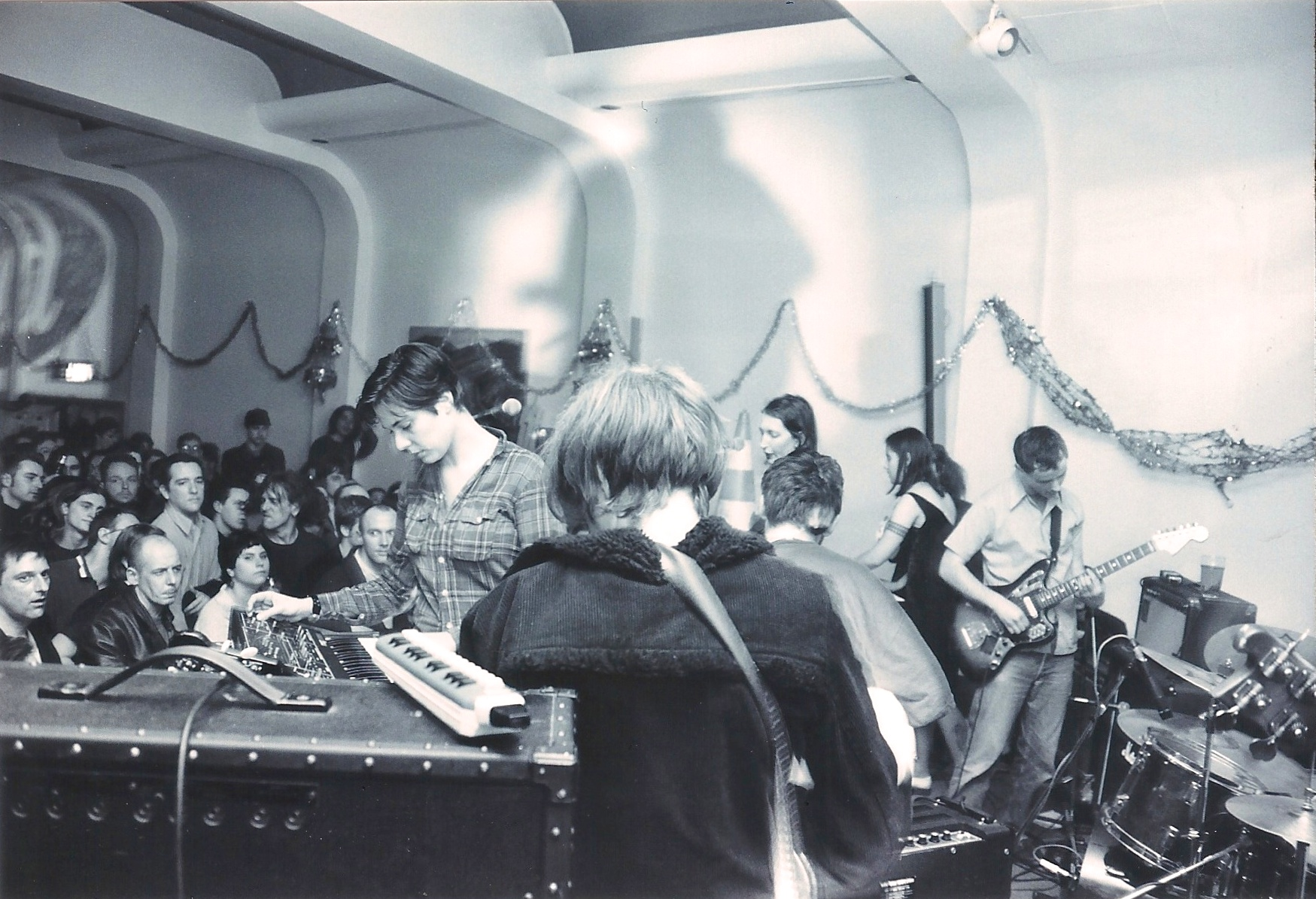
American and British groups such as Stereolab (pictured), Broadcast, and Saint Etienne were contemporaries to Shibuya-kei bands and shared many musical sensibilities, including the use of quoting, sampling, mixing, dubbing, and influences drawn from the 1950s and 1960s

Contrasting Shibuya-kei acts with contemporaneous American and British bands, Walters described the latter as "monolithic in their pursuit of a nearly singular mode of expression" and Shibuya-kei acts as "willfully impure and eclectic". Reynolds identified a parallel "underlying sensibility" in Western acts such as Urge Overkill, Stereolab, and Saint Etienne, while LA Weekly writer Liz Ohanesian extended the comparison to Momus, Thievery Corporation, Bis, and Belle and Sebastian.

=== Fashion and graphic design ===
The movement's clothing aesthetic drew from British mod culture, which had found an audience in Japan in the early 1980s, partly through the 1979 film Quadrophenia and the popularity of Paul Weller and the Jam in the country. Japanese mods, led by producer Manabu Kuroda, gravitated toward rare groove genres including soul, funk, R&B, yé-yé, jazz, and acid jazz, and Shibuya-kei drew much of its visual identity from their fashion sense. Marx described the defining clothing style as "vaguely French coastal — Saint James border shirts and berets".

Shibuya-kei artists adopted a visual design language that appeared from the mid-1980s on album covers, flyers, posters, and magazine layouts. Designer Mitsuo Shindo and his agency Contemporary Productions (CTPP) led this aesthetic; Shindo, a former mod, drew graphic references from Italian cinema, Op-art, nouvelle vague, American soul, lounge, and retro-futurism. CTPP's work used European typefaces such as Helvetica and Franklin Gothic, with photographs and illustrations each reduced to a single foregrounded element. Design collective Groovisions later extended the aesthetic, making Helvetica typography and flat color compositions fashionable in Japan through work drawing on Mark Farrow's sleeve designs for Spiritualized and Damien Hirst's Spots painting series.

== History ==
=== 1980s: Formative acts ===
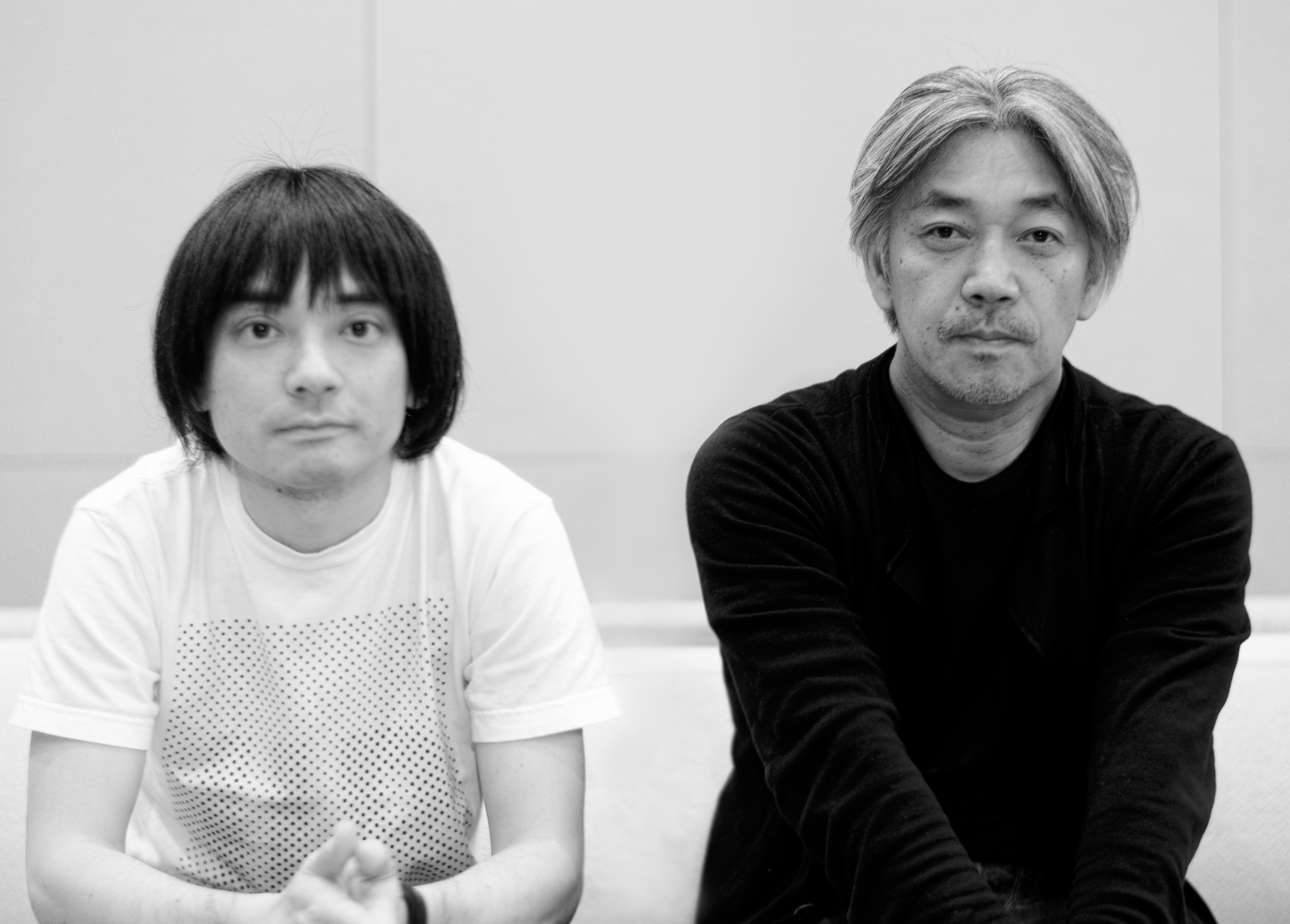
Keigo Oyamada (pictured left with Ryuichi Sakamoto) and Kenji Ozawa formed the core membership of Flipper's Guitar and introduced neo-acoustic and Madchester styles to the Japanese mainstream; Oyamada was later commonly regarded as "the king of Shibuya-kei".

Many of the acts that formed the Shibuya-kei scene shared ties to Yellow Magic Orchestra, through whose patronage many artists had developed their careers. Released by Haruomi Hosono's Non-Standard record label, Salon Music's singles "Muscle Daughter" (1984) and "Paradise Lost" (1985), produced by Yukihiro Takahashi, were cited by Sabukaru contributor Leonel Martinez as "proto-Shibuya-kei". (Note: Marx also referenced Salon Music as a band "often considered to be 'proto-Shibuya-kei'".) Pizzicato Five were subsequently signed to the label under Non-Standard producer Kenichi Makimura. The group's early albums Pizzicatomania (produced by Hosono, 1987) and Bellissima! (1988) are among the first major Shibuya-kei records and their debut is usually cited as the beginning of the movement.

In 1987, several Louis Philippe records entered the Japanese import charts simultaneously; he and other él acts, including Would-Be-Goods, also toured Japan that year. Philippe was later frequently cited as a contributor to the "launch [of] the Shibuya sound", according to AllMusic.

Salon Music's Zin Yoshida helped Lollipop Sonic secure a contract with Polystar; the group subsequently recorded under the name Flipper's Guitar and were produced by Makimura; they originally had five members before the label reduced it to the duo of Keigo Oyamada and Kenji Ozawa. Their first album, Three Cheers for Our Side (1989), sold poorly; their second, Camera Talk (1990), brought the duo commercial popularity and popularized the scene to a wider audience.

Marketed by Polystar as idols under the billing "Double Knockout Corporation", Oyamada and Ozawa wrote a column in Takarajima magazine and hosted a weekly FM Yokohama radio programme, Martians Go Home, in which they played Madchester, acid jazz, and guitar pop; their fashion choices, including berets and Breton shirts, were widely imitated. Cunningham described the two albums as the scene's "most consequential early works"; both records advanced a neo-acoustic style later adopted by acts including Nelories, Bridge, Johnny Dee, and Cymbals; he added that, while early Pizzicato Five albums drew similarly on cross-continental pop, Flipper's Guitar "were the first to perfect it".

=== Early 1990s: Growth ===
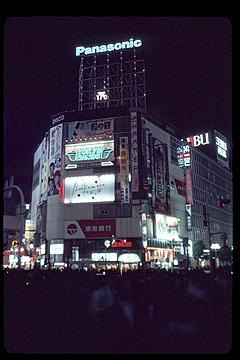
Shibuya Crossing in 1992

The scene's mainstream crossover followed the use of Shibuya-kei songs as themes in television commercials and dramas. Founded within the Noah Shibuya Building as a new wave and post-punk specialty shop, Zest shifted its stock in the early 1990s toward guitar pop, neo-acoustic, twee pop, jangle pop, soul, acid jazz, and Britpop. Its staff during this period included Hideki Kaji of Bridge, as well as Kenji Takimi, the founder of Crue-L Records, and Masashi Naka, the founder of Escalator Records, both of which became prominent Shibuya-kei labels. Inkstick, which opened in the Jingumae district in 1990, hosted the acid jazz and rare groove scene through "Routine", a weekly party run by the UFO DJ collective of Kei Kobayashi, Tokyo Ska Paradise Orchestra drummer Tatsuyuki Aoki, and critic Hiroshi Egaitsu. Similar parties took place at the ZOO in nearby Shimokitazawa, where Takimi held residency. Kahimi Karie also featured in these DJ lineups, drawing from French pop acts including France Gall, Françoise Hardy, and Gainsbourg, all of whom had a foothold in Japanese youth culture through the Renoma clothing brand.

The 1990 compilation album Fab Gear, co-compiled by Oyamada and él Records founder Mike Alway, collected recordings from early scene acts including Flipper's Guitar, Bridge, and Fancy Face Groovy Name (a duo of Karie and Takako Minekawa); Martinez described it as "one of the most influential documents of the movement in its early stage". Flipper's Guitar disbanded in October 1991 following their third and final album, Doctor Head's World Tower, which Martinez calls one of the movement's "most recognized" early records and credited with pushing subsequent Shibuya-kei acts in new directions. After their breakup, Flipper's Guitar's influence on the scene grew, stores including HMV and Wave continued shelving contemporaneous releases under "Shibuya Recommendation" sections, and its principal acts began collaborating.

Maki Nomiya joined Pizzicato Five as vocalist in this period, replacing Takao Tajima; their 1991 album This Year's Girl raised the group's standing as one of the movement's leading acts. Released within a two-month span, both Doctor Head's World Tower and This Year's Girl incorporated sampling and dance elements; each record's approach fed into distinct strands of Shibuya-kei that emerged through the mid-1990s. In Marx's description, this "first wave" of musicians introduced "a whole panoply of new sounds to Japanese popular music: UK indie/alternative scenes like anorak pop, neo-acoustic, and Madchester (Flipper's Guitar), hip hop (Scha Dara Parr), and '60s softpop and club jazz (Pizzicato Five)."

Pizzicato Five — "Sweet Soul Revue" (1993)
Co-produced by Oyamada, "Sweet Soul Revue" was Pizzicato Five's first major hit and, together with its parent album, Bossa Nova 2001, exemplified the genre's combination of 1960s Western pop and other styles.

Oyamada adopted the name Cornelius and in 1992 founded Trattoria Records as a Polystar subsidiary, releasing work by Shibuya-kei artists including Venus Peter, Bridge, and Karie, alongside Kaji and Wack Wack Rhythm Band. Trattoria also released Western records previously unavailable in Japan, among them Apples in Stereo and the Free Design, and added Salon Music to its roster. In 1993, he produced Pizzicato Five's Bossa Nova 2001, which reached the top ten in Japan; Martinez described it as "the blueprint for all Shibuya-kei albums to come", and Marx wrote that the album "would codify the 'Shibuya style' for the next decade".

After launching a solo career, Oyamada became one of the biggest Shibuya-kei successes with a string of top ten hits in Japan. His debut "The Sun Is My Enemy", released later in 1993, peaked at number 15 on Japanese singles charts; writing in 2013, The Japan Times contributor Ian Martin called it a "key track" that helped define Shibuya-kei, although Trattoria's roster made it "difficult to this day to say with any clarity what Shibuya-kei really sounded like", extending further to él Records alumni such as Would-Be-Goods and Philippe, alongside the more genre-distant acts Seagull Screaming Kiss Her Kiss Her, Violent Onsen Geisha, and Rovo.

=== 1994–1998: International popularity ===
Shibuya-kei shed its underground origins through the mid-1990s and became a recognized part of mainstream Japanese pop, although Reynolds states that it failed to replicate its Japanese commercial success abroad, its music remaining "peculiarly parochial, attuned to Japanese tastes". Independent acts reached the domestic mainstream for the first time, and Pizzicato Five and Cornelius became among Japan's most prominent "cultural exports", in Cunningham's description. Acts including Pizzicato Five, Cornelius, Buffalo Daughter, Fantastic Plastic Machine, Karie, Minekawa, Cibo Matto, and Towa Tei scored US releases during this period, many through independent labels including Matador and Grand Royal. The scene's most prominent act, Pizzicato Five, released Made in USA through Matador in 1994, their first full-length American release; the album marked their commercial peak in the U.S., where the single "Twiggy Twiggy" became a minor hit. The group were ultimately the most successful Shibuya-kei act and continued releasing music at roughly one album per year through 1998.

Towa Tei — "Technova" (1994)
"Technova", the lead single from Towa Tei's Future Listening!, which inspired a flourishing of downtempo in the scene.

From 1994 onwards, acts and labels took the sound in new directions. A "smoother" style modelled after Pizzicato Five's work was adopted by acts including Cibo Matto, Towa Tei, Karie, and Mayumi Kojima, who also drew on Brazilian and French pop, bossa nova, chanson, nu jazz, downtempo, trip hop, and film music. Other acts steered the genre toward electronic dance music and reggae, or incorporated elements of noise-pop and indie rock. Towa Tei, a former member of Deee-Lite who had returned to Japan from New York, released his debut album Future Listening! that year, leading to downtempo styles proliferating within the movement. Crue-L Records focused on funk, soul, and R&B acts within the scene; its releases included Love Tambourines' sole album Alive (1995), which Martinez described as the record that "solidified how the scene understood the Neo-Soul movement of the time". Minekawa's work, produced by Makimura and Buffalo Daughter, influenced later acts including Strawberry Machine from Nagoya; her recordings found a following on U.S. college radio, alongside Stereolab, Buffalo Daughter, and Broadcast.

According to CDJournal, 1994 and 1995 saw the end of the movement's "golden age": Keitaro Takanami departed from Pizzicato Five; Venus Peter, Love Tambourines, and Bridge each dissolved; and Original Love was reduced to a solo unit. Roboshop Mania, Advantage Lucy, and Cymbals were among the subsequent acts that formed. By the late 1990s, the Shibuya sound had permeated mainstream Japanese pop to the extent that major-label acts, including Puffy AmiYumi and My Little Lover, reflected its influence in their recordings. German label Bungalow released two compilations drawing from the genre's more electronic acts: Sushi 3003 – A Spectacular Collection of Japanese Clubpop (1996) and Sushi 4004 – The Return of Spectacular Japanese Clubpop (1998), the latter of which explicitly designated its featured acts as Shibuya-kei. Cibo Matto's debut Viva! La Woman (1996) drew coverage from American music publications, one of the scene's first releases to do so.

Cornelius — "Star Fruits Surf Rider" (1997)
Oyamada's album Fantasma is sometimes considered the finest work of Shibuya-kei; the centerpiece track, "Star Fruits Surf Rider", incorporates drum and bass.

In 1997, Oyamada's album Fantasma received praise from American music critics and came to be regarded as one of the greatest works of the genre. Cunningham considered it a pinnacle of plunderphonics and independent music more broadly, and, given its Matador release, the Shibuya-kei record most likely to have reached listeners outside Japan. Pizzicato Five's Yasuharu Konishi founded Readymade Records, releasing work by Fantastic Plastic Machine, Mansfield, and Comoestas Yaegashi; the label also issued compilations of 1960s recordings presented under the Shibuya-kei banner. Together with Towa Tei and Cibo Matto, Fantastic Plastic Machine, the project of Tomoyuki Tanaka, helped project an image of urban glamour associated with Shibuya that persisted through subsequent decades. Cunningham described these acts' sample-heavy, club-oriented production as significant to their collective legacy, and Pizzicato Five's Happy End of the World (1998) as the band's summation of their own "contribution" to the sound.

=== Late 1990s–2000s: Decline ===
Seth Timbs (left) and Fantastic Plastic Machine (right) recording together in 2001.

After Fantasma, acts adopting the original Shibuya sound were generally perceived as retro and the scene's prominence declined after its principal players began moving into other music styles. Concurrently, Internet-driven electronic and techno styles took hold in Japan as record culture contracted alongside the spread of portable music players. The original Wave chain closed in 1999. In 2001, Pizzicato Five disbanded, Karie stepped away from the genre, and Oyamada's Point, the follow-up to Fantasma, signaled his own breakaway. Trattoria closed around 2002.

Reynolds, citing Marx, wrote that the genre's conversion of music into "style signifiers and cultural capital" left its appeal dependent on esoteric knowledge whose value was "easily voided" once entrepreneurs published guides to decode its sources for younger fans. In Marx's estimation, part of the waning interest stemmed from the previously unfashionable cultural touchstones "Konishi and Oyamada worked so hard to discover" becoming mainstream. Martin attributed the decline to multiple factors: by the end of the 1990s, the genre's lounge-pop style had begun to "descend into self-parody" while audience tastes and consumer patterns shifted; Shimokitazawa produced bands that favored Britpop and American alternative rock over Shibuya-kei's polished eclecticism, and the Morning Musume-led idol revival steered mainstream music toward what Martin called "the slow, fateful path toward the AKBpocalypse".

By the early 2000s, outlets including Bonjour Records in Daikanyama distanced themselves from the Shibuya-kei label, while Relax magazine packaged the Shibuya-kei aesthetic alongside Ura-Harajuku street fashion for general readers. The café boom of the same period modeled itself on the genre's imagined European aesthetic rather than drawing on European culture directly. Chain stores such as Village Vanguard adopted similar curatorial sensibilities in their retail stock.

=== 2000s–2010s: Offshoots, J-pop, and Akishibu-kei ===
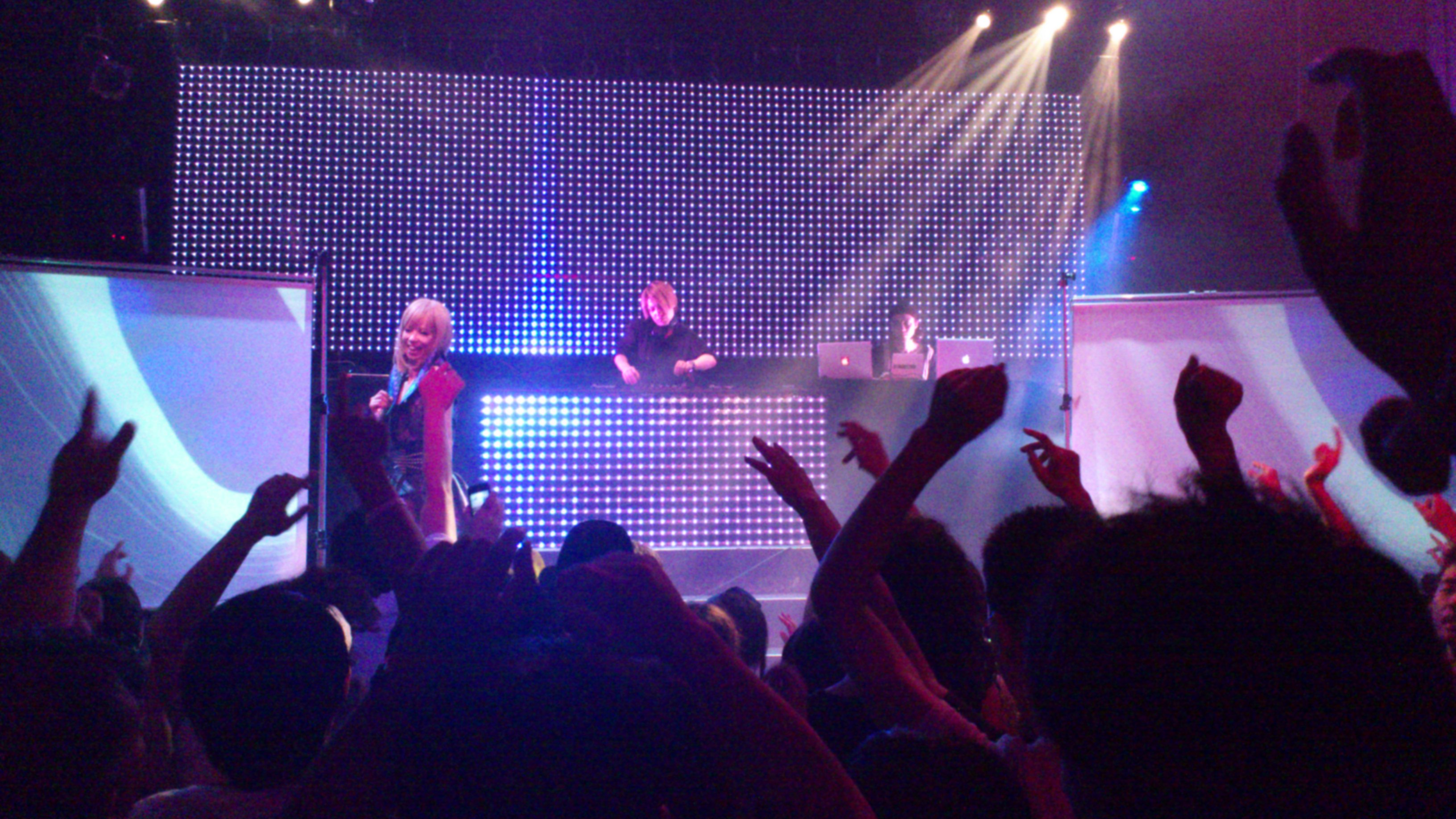
Neo-Shibuya-kei groups such as Capsule (performing in 2011) were largely rejected by the original scene.

As the movement dispersed into a range of adjacent styles, record labels such as Second Royal in Kyoto and Niw! Records in Tokyo continued to work in a similarly wide-ranging vein and acts such as Capsule, Sonic Coaster Pop and Plus-Tech Squeeze Box produced an electropop variant of the sound expanded from Tanaka's electronic style. Named from a Japanese onomatopoeia for video game sounds, an offshoot genre known as pico-pico (sometimes called picopop) originated around 1999 as a more frenetic variant of the Shibuya sound that drew prominently from timbres produced by early video game hardware. Usagi-Chang Records was one of the most significant labels associated with the movement; their roster included Sonic Coaster Pop, YMCK, MacDonald Duck Eclair, Micro Mach Machine, and Pine*AM.

Sales for both original and newer acts had decreased significantly, with Capsule the most commercially successful among them. From 2002, Tower Records and Marquee magazine promoted a set of younger acts under the "neo-Shibuya-kei" banner, including Capsule, Hazel Nuts Chocolate, Aprils, Dahlia, Petset, and Spaghetti Vabune!, among others. The Marquee editor-in-chief, known under the pseudonym MMM, applied "future pop" to these acts as a way to group them with Plus-Tech Squeeze Box and Usagi-Chang. Writing in 2004, Marx proposed an additional successor category, "post-Shibuya-kei", which comprised acts who had been outsider contemporaries of the original scene, among them Spank Happy, Qypthone, Cymbals, Paris Match, and Stoned Soul Picnic, as well as artists signed to labels headed by the original figures, including Halfby and Nomoto Karia on Readymade and Harvard on Escalator. The original musicians largely distanced themselves from neo-Shibuya-kei acts, many of whom consciously aspired to commercial mainstream success; Marx explained that the rejection was in part due to "the elders [having] created this sound from scratch" at a time when reference points such as 1960s soft pop were unfashionable: "The new kids are just working within this old paradigm, which they inherited wholesale and updated only with greater technical skills and electronic gimmicks."

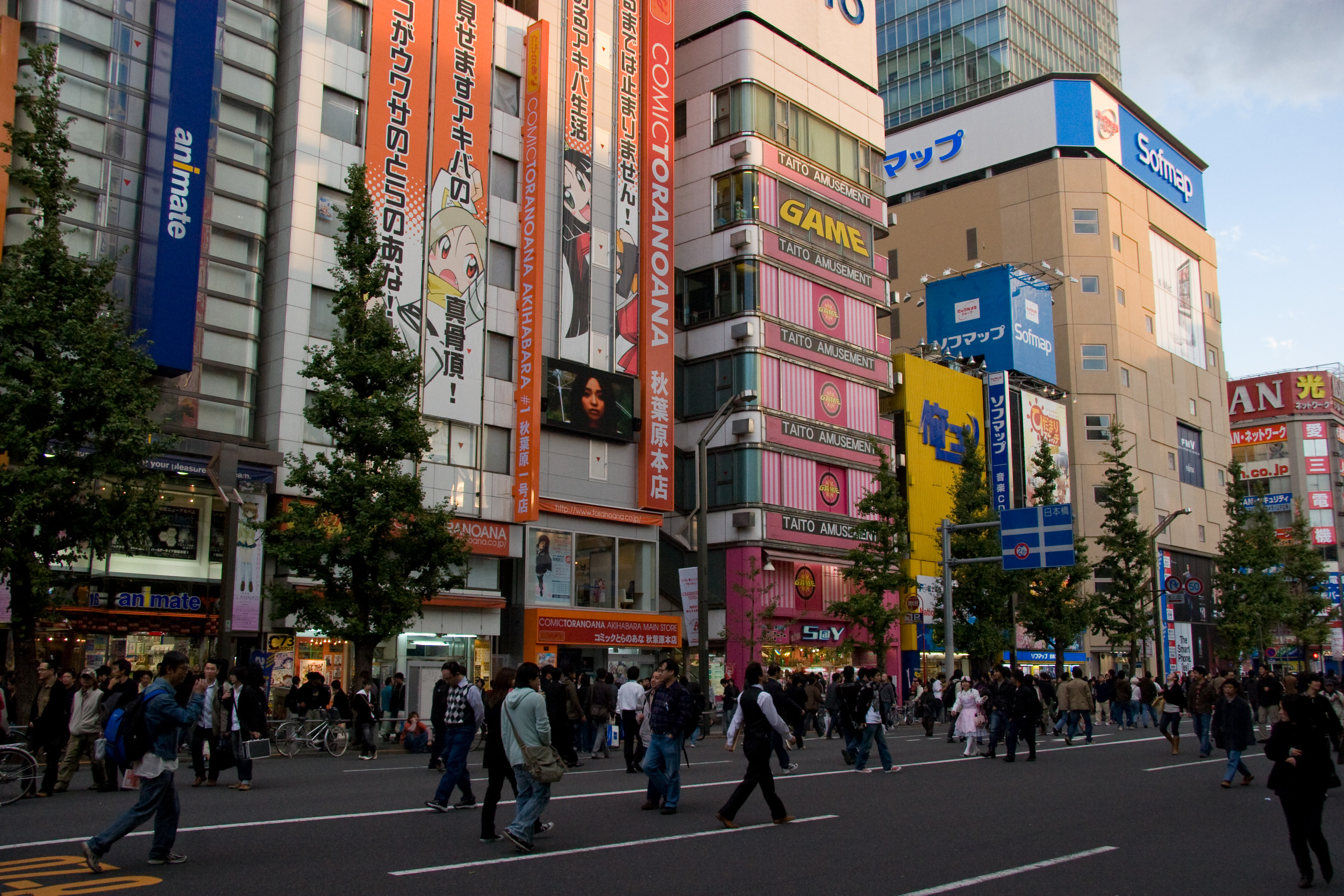
Akihabara in 2007, the center of an anime and gaming subculture whose fusion with the Shibuya sound, Akishibu-kei, was spearheaded by producer Masao Fukuda.

Akishibu-kei, a portmanteau of Shibuya-kei and the Akiba-kei anime and gaming subculture, was coined to describe a musical fusion of the two scenes. The movement was spearheaded by music producer Masao Fukuda of Victor Entertainment's Flying DOG label, who had commissioned former Shibuya-kei musicians for anime productions and later curated the 2007 compilation AKSB: This is Akishibu-kei!, which collected anime opening and ending themes produced by original Shibuya-kei figures including Keitaro Takanami, Shuntaro Okino (Venus Peter), Naruyoshi Kikuchi, and Yasuharu Konishi—alongside subsequent acts such as Round Table and Rocky Chuck. The trend extended beyond Flying DOG; among the former Shibuya-kei musicians at other labels who contributed to anime productions were Dan Miyagawa of Love Tambourines and Reiji Okii, formerly of Cymbals. Comparing Shibuya-kei with Akiba-kei, Marx wrote that while both subcultures were defined by intense pop-cultural enthusiasm, Shibuya-kei's orientation toward international source material contrasted with Akiba-kei's insular focus on domestic media.

By the mid-2000s, a form of guitar-led indie pop, also identified by Cunningham as "post-Shibuya-kei", had emerged and was practiced by Cymbals, Neil & Iraiza, Microstar and Roly Poly Rag Bear, while Lamp, Mayumi Kojima and Qypthone worked more in lounge, jazz-pop and bossa nova styles. The soundtrack to the 2004 video game Katamari Damacy, composed by Yu Miyake and others, was described by Cunningham as having "managed to define the post-Shibuya-kei Japanese pop landscape better than the rest", while Drowned in Sound writer Samuel Rosean credited it with bringing Shibuya-kei to a worldwide gaming audience. Many idol-scene producers had roots in Shibuya-kei, among them Yasutaka Nakata of Capsule, whose later productions for Perfume and Kyary Pamyu Pamyu extended elements of the genre through the 2000s and 2010s. Marx referred to Nakata's escalated post-Capsule success as embodying a shift toward "predictable melodies and melodrama" reflective of the increasing influence of Akiba-kei over "cutting-edge indie culture engaged in obscure international art and music".

HMV Shibuya closed in 2010, after more than a decade of decline in Japan's music retail market. In a 2015 interview, Momus opined that, although Shibuya-kei continued to influence many musicians, the genre remained "dead", explaining that the area itself had been integral to the subculture: "Shibuya today is just an overblown shopping district". Writing in 2017, Rosean argued that, while Shibuya-kei had ceased to function as a living scene and "persists today only in the most fragile sense, with just a few retro acts evoking its sound for nostalgia and simplistic aesthetic ends", its "postmodern sampling and retro fetishism" continued to influence Japanese art and music.

== See also ==
- Kitsch
- Art pop
- Remix culture
- Hauntology (music)

== Bibliography ==
- McKnight, Anne (2009). "Shibuya-Kei". The Encyclopedia of Contemporary Japanese Culture. Taylor & Francis. ISBN 978-0-415-48152-6.
- Onishi, Koji (1998). "Shibuya-Kei (Shibuya Sound) and globalization". In Mitsui, Tōru (ed.). Popular Music: Intercultural Interpretations. Graduate Program in Music, Kanazawa University. ISBN 978-4-9980684-1-9.
- Reynolds, Simon (2011). Retromania: Pop Culture's Addiction to Its Own Past. Farrar, Straus and Giroux. ISBN 978-1-4299-6858-4.
- Tonelli, Christopher (2004). Shibuya-kei? O-kei Desu!: Postmodernism, Resistance, and Tokyo Indie Culture. University of California, San Diego.
- Tonelli, Christopher (2014). "The Temporary Avatar Zone: Pico-Pico Parties in Tokyo". In Donnelly, K.J.; Gibbons, William; Lerner, Neil (eds.). Music In Video Games: Studying Play. Routledge Music and Screen Media Series. Routledge. ISBN 978-0-415-63444-1.
- Yoshitaka, Mori (2009). "Reconsidering Cultural Hybridities". In Berry, Chris; Liscutin, Nicola; Mackintosh, Jonathan D. (eds.). Cultural Studies and Cultural Industries in Northeast Asia: What a Difference a Region Makes. Hong Kong University Press. ISBN 978-962-209-975-3.
