= The Growlers discography =

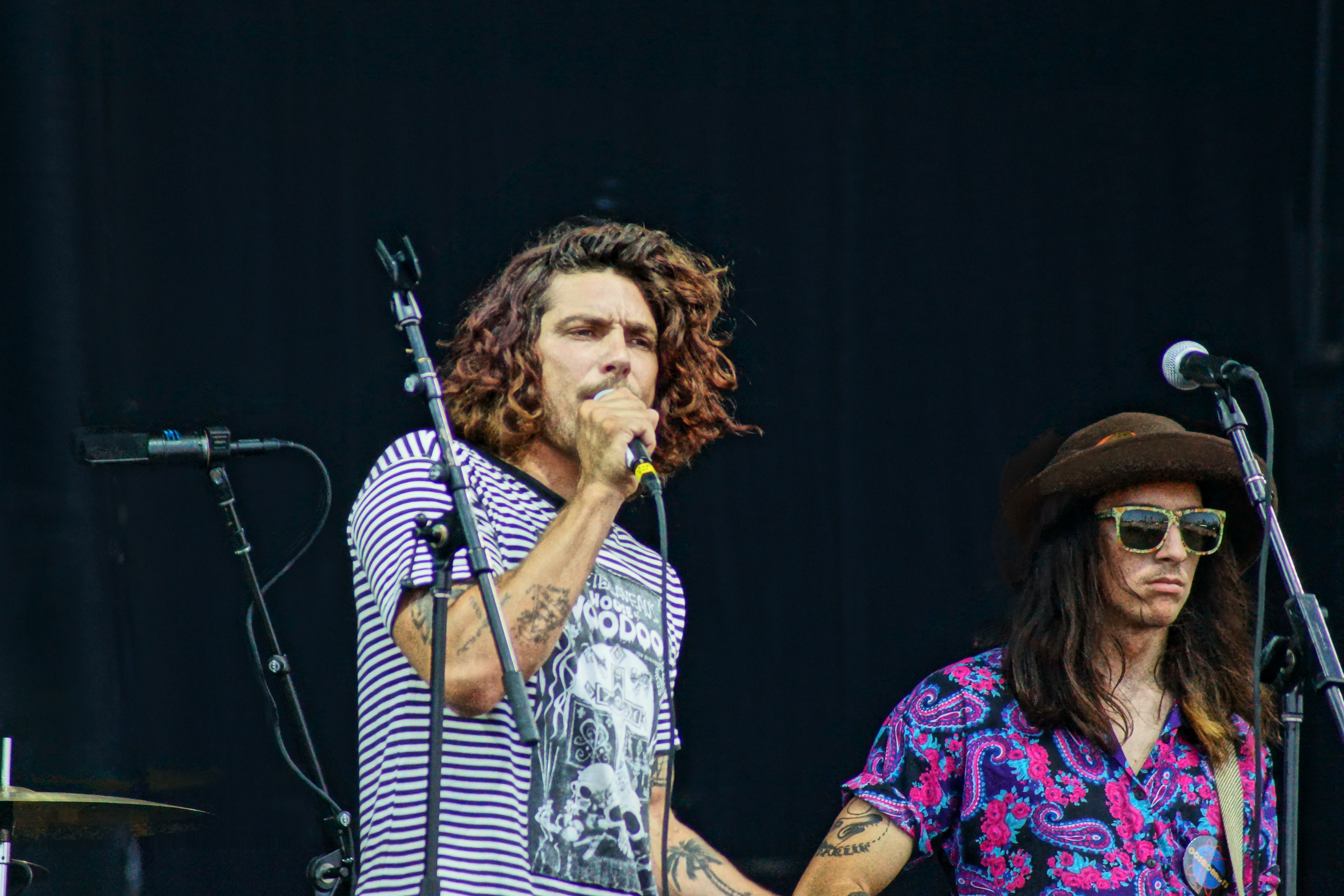
- The Growlers performing at Lollapalooza in 2012.
- Studio albums: 5
- EPs: 4
- Compilation albums: 1
- Singles: 6
- Music videos: 10

The Growlers are an American band that formed in 2006 in Dana Point, California. The band is composed of singer Brooks Nielsen, lead guitarist Matt Taylor and keyboard player/guitarist Kyle Straka. The Growlers have released six studio albums, four extended plays, one compilation album, and 10 singles. Three of their albums have charted in the Billboard charts.

The Growlers released their first album Are You In or Out? through Everloving Records in 2009 and their second album, Hot Tropics being released the following year.

== Studio albums ==
List of studio albums, with selected chart positions and certifications
Title	Album details	Peak chart positions					Certifications
Title	Album details	US	US Album Sales	US Heatseekers	US Indie	US Rock	Certifications
Are You In or Out?	Released: October 6, 2009; Label: Everloving; Format(s): CD, LP, digital download	—	—	—	—	—	
Hot Tropics	Released: June 15, 2010; Label: Everloving; Format(s): CD, LP, digital download	—	—	—	—	—	
Hung at Heart	Released: January 22, 2013; Label: Everloving; Format(s): CD, LP, digital download	—	—	14	—	—	
Chinese Fountain	Released: September 23, 2014; Label: Everloving; Format(s): CD, LP, digital download	173	173	7	35	49	
City Club	Released: September 30, 2016; Label: Cult; Format(s): CD, LP, digital download	—	—	6	33	40	
Natural Affair	Released: October 25, 2019; Label: Beach Goth Records; Format(s): CD, LP, cassette, digital download	—	—	—	—	—	

== Compilation albums ==
List of compilation albums
Title	Album details
Casual Acquaintances	Released: July 27, 2018; Label: Beach Goth; Format(s): CD, LP, digital download

== Extended plays ==
List of EPs
Title	Album details
Growlers / Thee Ludds	Released: October 3, 2011; Label: Palmist; Format(s): CD, LP, digital download
Gilded Pleasures	Released: November 12, 2013; Label: Everloving; Format(s): CD, LP, digital download
Gay Thoughts / Uncle Sam's A Dick	Released: December 9, 2015; Label: Beach Goth; Format(s): CD, LP, digital download

== Singles ==
List of singles, with selected chart positions and certifications, showing year released and album name
Title	Year	Album
"Gay Thoughts"	2011	Gay Thoughts / Uncle Sam's A Dick
"Uncle Sam's A Dick"	2012	Gay Thoughts / Uncle Sam's A Dick
"Gilded Pleasures"	2013	Gilded Pleasures
"Someday"	2013	Non-album single
"I'll Be Around"	2016	City Club
"City Club"	2016	City Club
"California"	2017	Non-album single
"Monotonia"	2017	Non-album single
"Lonely This Christmas"	2017	Non-album single
"Who Loves The Scum?"	2018	Non-album single

== Music videos ==
Song	Year	Director(s)
"Someone Something Jr."	2008	not credited
"People Don't Change Blues"	2010	Jack Coleman
"Gay Thoughts"	2011	Jack Coleman
"One Million Lovers"	2013	Taylor Bonin, Austin Chapman
"Good Advice"	2014	Taylor Bonin, Austin Chapman
"Humdrum Blues"	2014	Taylor Bonin
"Monotonia"	2014	Benjy Estrada
"Chinese Fountain"	2015	Jason Galea, Taylor Bonin
"Love Test"	2015	Taylor Bonin
"Not The Man"	2015	Taylor Bonin
"I'll Be Around"	2016	Warren Fu
"Going Gets Tough"	2016	Taylor Bonin, Scott Stinnett, and Kyle Mullarky
"Problems III"	2018	Aleia Murawski, Sam Copeland
"Who Loves the Scum?"	2019	Aleia Murawski, Sam Copeland
