= Mellow Waves =

Studio album by Cornelius
- Released: June 28, 2017
- Genre: Ambient pop
- Length: 41:59
- Label: Warner
- Producer: Keigo Oyamada

Cornelius chronology
Sensuous (2006)	Mellow Waves (2017)	Dream in Dream (2023)

Singles from Mellow Waves
- 1. "If You're Here" Released: April 26, 2017; 2. "Sometime / Someplace" Released: May 24, 2017; 3. "In a Dream" Released: September 27, 2017

Mellow Waves (2017) is the sixth studio album by Japanese musician Cornelius. It was released on June 28, 2017 by Warner Music Japan. The album received generally positive reviews from music critics, and it reached the top ten of the Oricon Albums Chart in Japan and the Billboard World Albums chart in the United States.

== Background and composition ==
After releasing his fifth studio album under the Cornelius moniker, 2006's Sensuous, Keigo Oyamada worked on a number of projects, including a collaboration with J-pop singer Salyu that resulted in the 2011 album S(o)un(d)beams, which was credited under the name Salyu × Salyu. Oyamada composed soundtracks for educational TV programs and the Ghost in the Shell: Arise anime series. He toured with Yoko Ono and Yellow Magic Orchestra and produced remixes for Philip Glass and Sakanaction. Oyamada also joined the electro supergroup Metafive, whose lineup includes Yoshinori Sunahara, Yukihiro Takahashi, Towa Tei, and others.

Oyamada explained to The Japan Times in 2016 that he was interested in recording a new solo album because, among other reasons, he did not have many opportunities to sing within his collaborative endeavors. He was also inspired by the amount of time that had elapsed since Sensuous. Between projects, Oyamada found time to work on his solo record. One track, "Mellow Yellow Feel", dates back to 2012. The lyrics for two of the album's songs, "If You're Here" and "Dear Future Person", were written by Shintaro Sakamoto of Yura Yura Teikoku. Another song, "The Spell of a Vanishing Loveliness", was written by Miki Berenyi, who Oyamada learned a decade earlier was his second cousin.

Distinct sounds have been used to represent sonic themes on previous Cornelius albums—a glass wind chime for Sensuous, and water for 2001's Point. Oyamada said the tremolo served a similar function on Mellow Waves, likening the sound to that of a continuous wave. Similarly, Oyamada chose the album's cover artwork because of its wavy appearance.

== Release ==
Mellow Waves was released in Japan on June 28, 2017 by Warner Music. It peaked at number 10 on the national Oricon Albums Chart. In advance of the album, two 7-inch singles were issued. The first single, "If You're Here", was released on April 26, 2017, and its music video, directed by Koichiro Tsujikawa, was released in May. The second single, "Sometime / Someplace", was released on May 24, followed the next month by its music video, directed by Yugo Nakamura.

On July 21, 2017, Mellow Waves was released worldwide by Rostrum Records. In the United States, it reached number seven on the Billboard World Albums chart. July 2017 also saw the release of a music video for "In a Dream", directed by Groovisions, with the song itself being issued as a 7-inch single on September 27. A music video for "Dear Future Person", also directed by Groovisions, was released in January 2018. Music videos for "The Spell of a Vanishing Loveliness" and "Surfing on Mind Wave Pt. 2", both directed by Koichiro Tsujikawa, were released in March and September, respectively. On September 19, 2018, Cornelius released Ripple Waves, a companion album to Mellow Waves consisting of new songs, live tracks, and various artists' reworkings of songs from Mellow Waves.

== Critical reception ==
Professional ratings
Aggregate scores
Source	Rating
AnyDecentMusic?	7.1/10
Metacritic	74/100
Review scores
Source	Rating
AllMusic	4/5 stars
The A.V. Club	B
Financial Times	4/5 stars
The Independent	3/5 stars
Mojo	3/5 stars
Pitchfork	7.7/10
PopMatters	7/10
Record Collector	4/5 stars
Uncut	7/10
Under the Radar	8/10

Mellow Waves received generally positive reviews from music critics. At Metacritic, which assigns a normalized rating out of 100 to reviews from mainstream critics, the album received an average score of 74, based on 18 reviews.

Reviewing the album, AllMusic's Heather Phares wrote, "Despite its calm demeanor, Mellow Waves is nearly as intricate as Cornelius' previous albums, and its masterful ebb and flow just gets richer with each listen." Andy Gill of The Independent found that "it's the overall cool/warm Tropicalismo tone that's most engaging" about the album. Stephen Wyatt of Under the Radar observed that "what it lacks in frenetic playfulness it makes up in melody and orchestration."

Pitchfork's Jesse Jarnow called it "as subdued an album as Oyamada has made", while adding that "thankfully 'subdued,' by Cornelius's standards, still entails unceasing rhythmic invention, perhaps the central musical theme of his career." Tanner Smith of PopMatters said: "Mellow Waves's mellowness is more in the eye of the beholder. As nice as the vibe is, there is a high level of mental activity here that definitely put it into a more experimental arena than the soft sounds might imply."

== Track listing ==
All tracks are written by Keigo Oyamada, except where noted.

No.	Title	Writer(s)	Length
1.	"If You're Here" (あなたがいるなら)	Oyamada; Shintaro Sakamoto	6:12
2.	"Sometime / Someplace" (いつか / どこか)		3:49
3.	"Dear Future Person" (未来の人へ)	Oyamada; Sakamoto	4:38
4.	"Surfing on Mind Wave Pt. 2"		5:34
5.	"In a Dream" (夢の中で)		4:14
6.	"Helix / Spiral"		3:35
7.	"Mellow Yellow Feel"		4:38
8.	"The Spell of a Vanishing Loveliness"	Oyamada; Miki Berenyi	3:01
9.	"The Rain Song"		2:49
10.	"Crépuscule"		3:29
Total length:			41:59

== Personnel ==
Credits are adapted from the album's liner notes.

- Keigo Oyamada – performance, production
- Miki Berenyi – vocals on "The Spell of a Vanishing Loveliness"
- Leo Imai – translation
- Masakazu Kitayama – sleeve design
- Kazuyuki Kobayashi – executive production
- Toyoaki Mishima – programming, recording
- Tadayoshi Nakabayashi – etching
- Ichiro Oka – executive production
- Masayoshi Sukita – photography
- Rumi Suwabe – hair, makeup
- Ryoma Suzuki – supervision
- Tohru Takayama – mastering, mixing

== Charts ==
Chart (2017–2018)	Peak position
Japanese Albums (Oricon)	10
Japanese Hot Albums (Billboard Japan)	8
US Dance/Electronic Album Sales (Billboard)	7
US World Albums (Billboard)	7
