= Anata o Tamotsu Mono =

2015 song performed by Maaya Sakamoto

Single by Maaya Sakamoto and Cornelius
- Released: June 17, 2015
- Genre: Shibuya-kei
- Length: 3:57
- Label: FlyingDog
- Songwriters: Shintaro Sakamoto; Cornelius
- Producer: Cornelius

Maaya Sakamoto and Cornelius singles chronology
"Kore Kara" (2015)	"Anata o Tamotsu Mono" / "Mada Ugoku" (2015)	"Million Clouds" (2016)

Audio sample
- file; help

Music video
- "Anata o Tamotsu Mono" on YouTube

"Anata o Tamotsu Mono" (あなたを保(たも)つもの; lit. "What Sustains You") is a song recorded by Japanese singer Maaya Sakamoto and Japanese musician Cornelius. It was released as a double A-side single alongside the song "Mada Ugoku" by FlyingDog on June 17, 2015. It was written by Shintaro Sakamoto of the band Yura Yura Teikoku and composed by Cornelius, who produced and arranged the track as well as playing all the music. The song served as the opening theme to the Tokyo MX anime Ghost in the Shell: Arise – Alternative Architecture.

== Chart performance ==
The single entered the daily Oricon Singles Chart at number 15. It peaked at number 10 on the daily chart. The single debuted at number 18 on the weekly Oricon Singles Chart, with 4,000 copies sold. It charted for four consecutive weeks, selling a reported total of 6,000 copies.

== Track listing ==
All tracks are written by Shintaro Sakamoto and Cornelius.

No.	Title	Arranger(s)	Length
1.	"Anata o Tamotsu Mono" (あなたを保つもの, "What Sustains You")	Cornelius	3:57
2.	"Mada Ugoku"	Cornelius	5:48
3.	"Tokyo Samui" (東京寒い, "Tokyo Cold")	Cornelius	5:05
Total length:			14:51

== Credits and personnel ==
Personnel

- Vocals – Maaya Sakamoto
- Songwriting – Shintaro Sakamoto, Cornelius
- Arrangement, all instruments – Cornelius
- Engineering, programming – Toyoaki Mishima
- Mixing, mastering – Tohru Takayama

== Charts ==
Chart (2015)	Peak position	Sales
Japan Daily Singles (Oricon)	10	6,000
Japan Weekly Singles (Oricon)	18	6,000
Japan Hot 100 (Billboard)	46	6,000
Japan Hot Animation (Billboard)	6	6,000
Japan Top Singles Sales (Billboard)	16	6,000
