= Cornelius (musician) =

Japanese musician (born 1969)

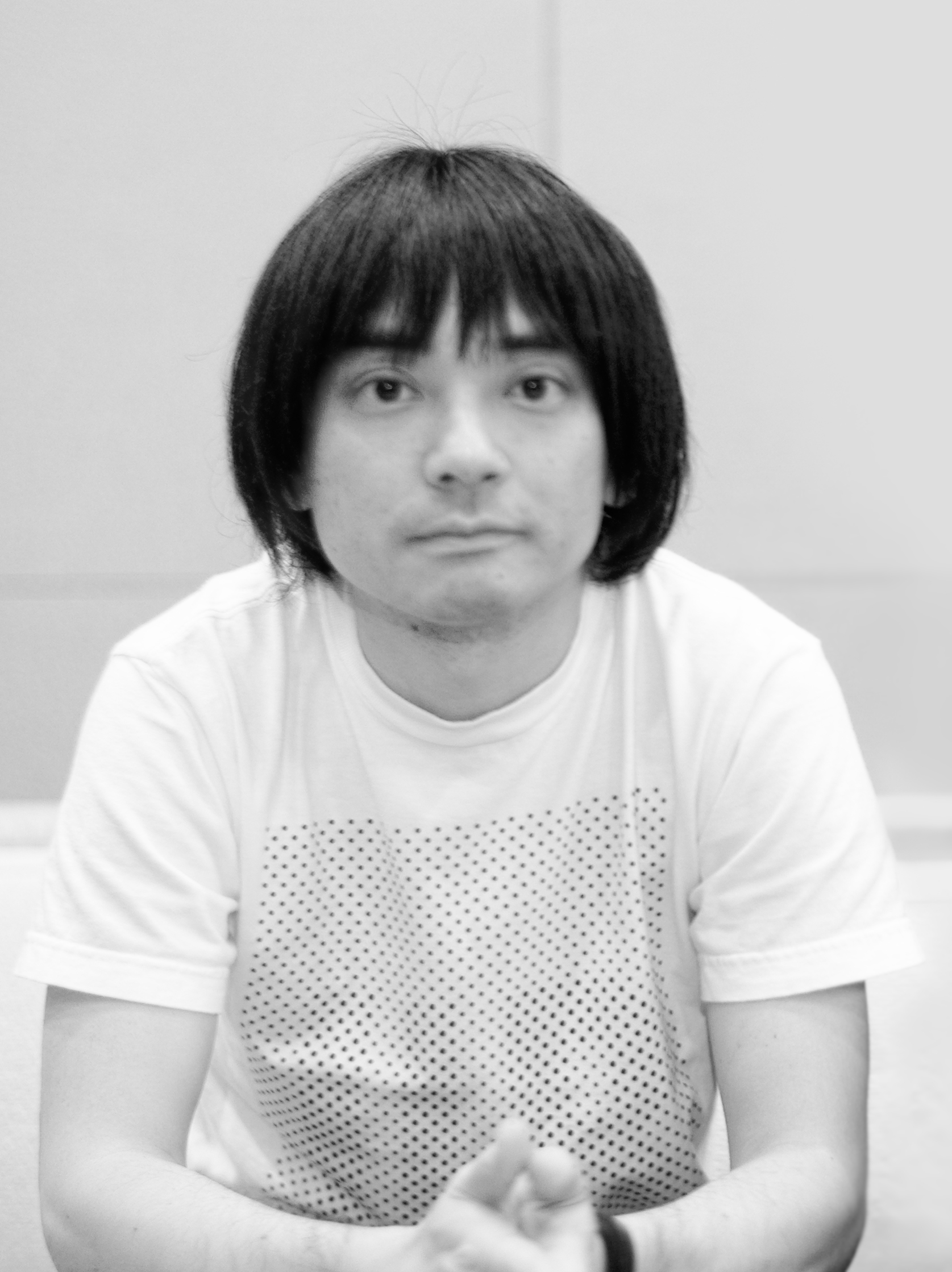
- Oyamada in 2007

Background information
- Born: Keigo Oyamada; January 27, 1969 (age 57); Setagaya, Tokyo, Japan
- Genre: Shibuya-kei
- Occupations: Musician; producer; vocalist
- Instruments: Guitar; vocals; sitar; harmonica; synthesizers; ukulele; harp; kazoo
- Years active: 1987–present
- Labels: Warner Music Group; Rostrum Records; Lefse Records; Everloving Records; Cherry Red; Trattoria Records (1992–2002); Matador Records (1998–2005)
- Spouse: Takako Minekawa (2000–2012)
- Website: cornelius-sound.com

Keigo Oyamada (小山田 圭吾, Oyamada Keigo; born January 27, 1969), also known by his moniker Cornelius (コーネリアス, Kōneriasu), is a Japanese singer, songwriter, and record producer who co-founded the indie pop band Flipper's Guitar in 1988. Following their breakup in 1991, Oyamada pursued a solo career. He is regarded as one of the principal figures of the 1990s Shibuya-kei music and art scene.

== Life and career ==
=== 1980s–1990s ===
Oyamada was born in Setagaya, Tokyo, Japan. His first claim to fame was as a member of the pop duo Flipper's Guitar, one of the key groups of the Tokyo Shibuya-kei scene. Following the disbandment of Flipper's Guitar in 1991, Oyamada donned the "Cornelius" moniker and embarked on a solo career. He commissioned a song, about himself, on Momus' 1999 album Stars Forever.

In 1997, he released the album Fantasma, which landed him praise from American music critics, who called him a "modern-day Brian Wilson" or the "Japanese Beck". In 2007, Rolling Stone Japan ranked Fantasma in 10th place amongst the "100 Greatest Japanese Rock Albums of All Time".

In April 1999, he performed at The Bowlie Weekender, a music festival curated by Belle and Sebastian. Starting in August, he joined The International Music Against Brain Degeneration Revue, a tour organized by The Flaming Lips—also Bowlie participants—which featured artists including Sebadoh, Robyn Hitchcock, IQU, and Sonic Boom. That same year, he also performed at the Glastonbury, Reading and Leeds, and Coachella festivals.

=== 2000s–2010s ===
By September 2006, he was no longer signed to Matador Records.

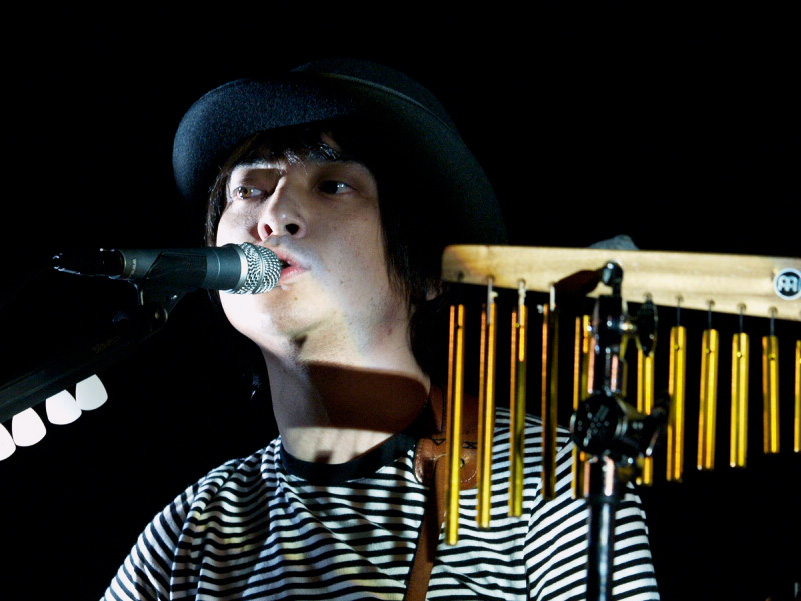
Cornelius at the 2007 Moers Festival

In December 2008, Sensurround + B Sides was nominated for Best Surround Sound Album at the 2009 GRAMMY Awards.

In 2009, he began performing as a member of Yoko Ono Plastic Ono Band. On the album Between My Head and the Sky, released in September of that year, he performed on guitar, bass, Tenori-on, programming, and percussion.

In 2010, he contributed the song "Katayanagi Twins vs. Sex Bob-Omb" to the film soundtrack of Scott Pilgrim vs. the World.

In 2011, he began the salyu × salyu project with Japanese singer Salyu, producing the album s(o)un(d)beams, released in April.

In 2013, he participated with Taku Satoh and Yugo Nakamura directing the music for the exhibition Design Ah! at 21 21 Design Sight in Tokyo.

In January 2016, METAFIVE—a band formed by Yukihiro Takahashi, Yoshinori Sunahara, Towa Tei, Tomohiko Gondo, Leo Imai, and Oyamada—released its first album, META.

In 2017, he produced the vinyl record Audio Check Track for checking audio equipment settings. That October, he also performed as a special guest at Beck’s live show at the Nippon Budokan.

In 2018, he performed three songs from his album Mellow Waves on NPR's “Tiny Desk Concert”. In the same year, he composed "Audio Architecture" for an exhibition of the same name held in Tokyo. The title of the exhibition was inspired by a phrase used by Sean Ono Lennon to describe Cornelius’s music.

In 2019, he released the digital single "Too Much Love for Sauna," written as the opening theme for Sado, a sauna-themed Japanese TV drama series. Later, a newly arranged version was released in 2024 and used as the opening theme for the sequel, under the title "Too Much Love for Sauna (Falling Deep)."

=== 2020s–present ===
In 2020, he released a limited white vinyl LP—a collection of tracks originally written as background music for PARCO, a cultural complex in Shibuya. Rosalía shared a Met Gala–themed Vogue playlist in May, featuring her all-time favorite songs and including Cornelius’s “Typewrite Lesson.”

In 2021, he released “Forbidden Apple,” an instrumental track featuring the sound of biting an apple, written to showcase Sony’s 360 Reality Audio surround technology (and can also be heard in standard stereo). That same year, he contributed “Kora (Cornelius Remix)” to GoGo Penguin’s May release GGP/RMX.

In 2022, he performed Yellow Magic Orchestra’s “Cue” with Haruomi Hosono at a concert celebrating Yukihiro Takahashi’s 50th anniversary in music, and contributed a remodel of “Thatness and Thereness”, originally from Ryuichi Sakamoto’s 1980 album B-2 Unit, to A Tribute to Ryuichi Sakamoto – To the Moon and Back, released in November.

In 2023, he exhibited his installation works at “Ambient Kyoto 2023,” which showcased ambient-themed audiovisual art. In December, he co-curated a music playlist with Terry Riley for the BBC Radio program “Ambient Focus”.

In 2024, he held Cornelius 30th Anniversary shows in Japan and "Dream In Dream" World Tour 2024. At the Barbican Centre in London, Ichiko Aoba performed as a special guest. he also created the show music for KENZO Fall-Winter 2024 Runway Show by Nigo, presented at Paris Fashion Week in January. Later that year, Velludo—a neo-psychedelic band formed in the late 1980s around him and Shuntaro Okino—released its first album, Between The Lines. A television program commemorating the 30th anniversary of Cornelius's debut was also broadcast.

In January 2025, Ichiko Aoba brought him out as a special guest at her 15th anniversary concert in Kyoto. In March, he performed at co-headlining concerts with The Flaming Lips in Tokyo, and in October with Ryoji Ikeda in Osaka. The Japanese CD edition of Sparks’ May release MAD! included “Do Things My Own Way (Cornelius Remix)”. On October 7, Gwenno digitally released “Utopia (Cornelius Remix)”.

In May 2026, he performed at a co-headlining concert with Sparks in Tokyo.

== Musical style ==
Cornelius — "The Sun Is My Enemy" (1993)
One of the defining examples of a genre later dubbed "Shibuya-kei", Oyamada's solo debut record combined a bossa nova beat with a British guitar pop akin to él Records, as well as jazz, funk and soul influences.

Cornelius was a pioneer of the Shibuya-kei style of music in Japan. The music of Cornelius could be described as experimental and exploratory, and often incorporates dissonant elements alongside more familiar harmonically "pleasing" sounds. He also incorporates sounds and samples from mass culture, pure electronic tones, and sounds from nature (such as on his Point album).

== Trattoria Records ==
Trattoria Records was a Japanese record company formed by Oyamada in 1993. and it was owned by Polystar, a group of independent record labels. The label went defunct in 2002, and most of their artists went to the Felicity label.

=== Roster ===
- Apples in Stereo
- Asa-Chang & Junray
- Bridge
- Citrus
- Corduroy
- Cornelius
- Hanatarash
- Hideki Kaji
- Hiromix
- Kahimi Karie
- Takako Minekawa
- OOIOO
- Papas Fritas
- Louis Philippe
- Salon Music
- Seagull Screaming Kiss Her Kiss Her
- Vodka Collins
- Wack Wack Rhythm Band
- Would-be-goods
- Bill Wyman - Reissue

== Personal life ==
Oyamada married musician and collaborator Takako Minekawa in 2000 and they have one child, Milo, named after the son of Cornelius in Planet of the Apes. They divorced in 2012. Since 2020, he has been in a long term relationship with Minami Yamaguchi, the owner of a fashion shop in Setagaya, Tokyo. He is a second cousin of Joi Ito and Miki Berenyi, the latter who appears on the song "The Spell of a Vanishing Loveliness" from Mellow Waves.

=== Bullying controversy ===
In a 1995 interview for Quick Japan, Oyamada said he was involved with a group of bullies who had locked a disabled student in a vaulting box and recounted several episodes reflecting his friendship with him, which lasted from elementary through high school. The interview reported that he did not commit additional acts of bullying, but witnessed them. In the same article, the disabled student was solicited for comment and referred to Oyamada as a friend.

On July 14, 2021, the Tokyo Organising Committee of the Olympic and Paralympic Games (TOCOG) announced that Oyamada would be a composer of the 2020 Summer Olympics opening ceremony. Following this, a post containing false excerpts from the original interviews was circulated by an anti-Olympics account on Twitter, triggering a social media backlash. Two days later, Oyamada tweeted an apologizing for his "thoughtless remarks and actions" against other students during his youth and was deserving of criticism, although the articles had contained exaggerations and mistakes, such as a claim that he had forced a student to masturbate. Toshirō Mutō, the chief executive of the Organising Committee, said he wanted Oyamada to remain. On July 19, four days before the ceremony, Oyamada decided to leave the creative team for the Tokyo Olympics on his own terms. A television program he had scored was removed from broadcasting.

In September, Shūkan Bunshun published a more detailed statement drawn from a two-hour interview with Oyamada, in which he explained that some of the claims had originated from the false excerpts that circulated. In 2023 and 2024, two major publishers in Japan released books about the controversy. One of the books argues that a distorted image of him, shaped in the 2000s on 2channel, an anonymous Japanese message board, and later on a blog, led to an infodemic spread by the mainstream media. Another author, after having interviewed several of Oyamada’s former classmates, states that he was unable to confirm facts as reported in media coverage.

== Discography ==
Cornelius discography
- Studio albums: 8
- Extended plays: 3
- Soundtrack albums: 3
- Singles: 31
- Video albums: 7
- Remix and Compilation albums: 12

The discography of Cornelius consists of eight studio albums, three soundtracks, twelve remix and compilation albums, three extended plays, thirty one singles and seven video albums.

=== Studio albums ===
Year	Information	Chart positions			
Year	Information	JPN	UK	US Elec.	US Indie
1994	The First Question Award: Labels: Trattoria Records, Polystar; Released: February 25, 1994	4	—	—	—
1995	69/96: Labels: Trattoria, Polystar; Released: June 9, 1995	3	—	—	—
1997	Fantasma: Labels: Trattoria, Polystar, Matador, Lefse Records; Released: August 6, 1997	6	—	—	—
2001	Point: Labels: Trattoria, Polystar, Matador; Released: October 24, 2001	4	124	17	47
2006	Sensuous: Labels: Warner Music Japan, Everloving; Released: October 25, 2006	8	—	18	—
2017	Mellow Waves: Labels: Warner Music Japan, Rostrum; Released: June 28, 2017	10	—	10	—
2023	Dream in Dream: Labels: Warner Music Japan, Like; Released: June 28, 2023	7	—	—	—
2026	Refractions: Labels: Warner Music Japan, Eat Your Own Ears; Released: August 19, 2026	15	—	—	—

=== Soundtracks ===
- Design Ah! (Warner Music Japan; January 23, 2013) – JP No. 33
- Ghost in the Shell: Arise (Flying Dog; november 27, 2013)
- The Cat That Lived a Million Times (Warner Music Japan; October 31, 2013) (EP)
- Ghost in the Shell: The New Movie O.S.T. (Flying Dog; June 15, 2015)
- Design Ah! 2 (Warner Music Japan; March 21, 2018)
- Design Ah! 3 (Warner Music Japan; July 18, 2018)

=== Remix and compilation albums ===
Year	Information	JP chart	Notes
1996	96/69: Labels: Trattoria, Polystar; Released: June 9, 1996	6	Remix LP of 69/96
1998	FM – Fantasma Remixes: Released: November 26, 1998; Labels: Trattoria, Polystar, Matador	39	Various artists' remixes of Fantasma; Mixes by Money Mark, the High Llamas, Buffalo Daughter, the Pastels, Yasuharu Konishi (Japan only), Damon Albarn, Unkle, Coldcut
1998	CM – Cornelius Remixes: Labels: Trattoria, Polystar, Matador; Released: November 26, 1998	40	Cornelius' remixes of artists contributing to FM; Mixes of Unkle, Money Mark, Buffalo Daughter, Coldcut, the Pastels, the High Llamas, Salon Music (not on Japan edition)
2003	CM2 – Interpretation by Cornelius: Labels: Warner Music Japan; Released: June 25, 2003	29	Cornelius remix collection; Mixes of Blur, k.d. lang, Beck, Gerling, the Avalanches, Moby, Manic Street Preachers, Sting, Tahiti 80 and more
2004	PM by Humans: Labels: Matador; Released: January 20, 2004	87	Various artists' remixes of Point.; Released together with the 5.1 DVD-Audio of Point as Five Point One + PM by Humans
2009	CM3 – Interpretation Remixed by Cornelius: Labels: Warner Music Japan; Released: May 13, 2009	32	Cornelius remix collection; Mixes of Kings of Convenience, Bloc Party, the Go! Team, James Brown, Sting, Ryuichi Sakamoto and more
2012	CM4: Labels: Warner Music Japan; Released: September 5, 2012	53	Cornelius remix collection; Mixes Yoko Ono Plastic Ono Band, Beastie Boys, MGMT, Arto Lindsay, Lali Puna, Haruo Minami, Tomoyasu Hotei, Maia Hirasawa and more
2015	Constellations of Music: Labels: Warner Music Japan; Released: August 19, 2015	30	Collaboration and remix album with various artists; Mixes of Penguin Cafe, Gotye, Shintaro Sakamoto, Plastic Sex, Sakanaction; Collaboration with the Bird and the Bee, salyu × salyu, Korallreven, Yumiko Ohno
2018	Ripple Waves: Labels: Warner Music Japan; Released: September 19, 2018	31	A new track, tracks previously unreleased on CD, live tracks, and reworkings of songs from Mellow Waves; Reworks by artists such as Haruomi Hosono, Ryuichi Sakamoto, Beach Fossils, Hiatus Kaiyote, Lawrence (Felt)
2023	Selected Ambient Works 00-23 (cassette only): Labels: Warner Music Japan; Released: October 6, 2023	-	A collection featuring ambient-tinged works
2024	Ethereal Essence: Labels: Warner Music Japan; Released: June 26, 2024	24	A collection featuring new tracks and reworkings of recent ambient-tinged works; The track "Koko" was created for Shuntaro Tanikawa's 2018 exhibition
2025	FANTASMA Bonus Tracks (digital release): Labels: Warner Music Japan; Released: July 10, 2025	-	A collection of tracks included on Disc 2 of the limited edition 2010 reissue of Fantasma; Rare tracks and live recordings, remixes of Fantasma songs by artists such as Damon Albarn, The High Llamas, and The Pastels

=== Extended plays ===
- Holidays in the Sun (September 10, 1993) JP No. 12
- Cornelius Works 1999 (1999), rare CD-R promo from 3-D Corporation Ltd. (Japan)
- Gum EP (2008)

=== Singles ===
Year	Title	Chart positions		Album
Year	Title	JPN	UK	Album
1993	"The Sun Is My Enemy"	15	–	The First Question Award
1993	"Perfect Rainbow"	29	–	The First Question Award
1994	"(You Can't Always Get) What You Want"	27	–	The First Question Award
1994	"Moon Light Story"	40	–	The First Question Award
1995	"Moon Walk" (cassette only)	30	–	69/96
1997	"Star Fruits Surf Rider"	17	142	Fantasma
1997	"Free Fall" (UK only)	N/R	–	Fantasma
1997	"Chapter 8 – Seashore and Horizon –" (UK only)	N/R	–	Fantasma
2001	"Point of View Point"	16	142	Point
2001	"Drop"	12	82	Point
2006	"Music"	17	–	Sensuous
2006	"Breezin'"	20	–	Sensuous
2015	"Anata o Tamotsu Mono" / "Mada Ugoku" (with Maaya Sakamoto)	18	–	Ghost in the Shell: The New Movie O.S.T.
2017	"Anata ga Iru Nara(if you're here)"	31	–	Mellow Waves
2017	"Itsuka / Dokoka (Sometime/Someplace)"	35	–	Mellow Waves
2017	"Yume no Naka de (In A Dream)"	24	–	Mellow Waves
2018	"Spotify Singles"	–	–	Ripple Waves
2021	"Forbidden Apple"	–	–	Ethereal Essence
2022	"Change and Vanish (feat. mei ehara)"	–	–	–
2023	"Change and Vanish"	–	–	Dream in Dream
2023	"Sparks"	–	–	Dream in Dream
2023	"All Things Must Pass"	–	–	Dream in Dream
2024	"Sketch For Spring"	–	–	Ethereal Essence
2024	"Too Much Love For Sauna (Falling Deep)"	–	–	Ethereal Essence
2024	"Bad Advice" (feat. Arto Lindsay) / "Mind Train"	–	–	Refractions
2025	"Glow Within"	–	–	–
2026	"Yumenemi"	–	–	Refractions
2026	"Aeons (feat. Sean Ono Lennon)"	–	–	Refractions
2026	"Twisting & Glistening"	–	–	Refractions

=== Video ===
- Promotions! (1994), music videos
- Love Heavy Metal Style Music Vision (1994) – live performances
- EUS (2000) – live performances
- Five Point One (2003) – a DVD package of music videos and PM
- From Nakameguro to Everywhere Tour '02–'04 (2008) – live performances
- Sensurround (2008) – a DVD version of Sensuous with accompanying videos and 5.1 surround sound
- Sensuous Synchronized Show (2009) – live performances
- Ghost In The Shell Arise Alternative Architecture Music Clips: Music By Cornelius (2015)

=== Compilation appearances ===
- Sushi 3003 (October 3, 1996)
- Sushi 4004 (August 5, 1998)
- Tribute Spirits (May 1, 1999)
- The Powerpuff Girls: Heroes & Villains (Music Inspired by the Powerpuff Girls) (July 18, 2000)
- DJ-Kicks: Erlend Øye (April 19, 2004)
- Matador at Fifteen (October 12, 2004)
- Rhythm De Asobou (July 12, 2005)
- The Wired CD: Rip. Sample. Mash. Share. (2009)
- Brand Neu! (May 11, 2009)
- WE LOVE Hair Stylistics! (2023)

=== Other works ===
- Produced Pizzicato Five's Bossa Nova 2001 (1993)
- Coloris (2006) – a Nintendo bit Generations game for Game Boy Advance
- Composed the music played by the Katayanagi Twins in the film Scott Pilgrim vs. the World (2010)
- HOSONO HARUOMI compiled by OYAMADA KEIGO (2019), a two-disc compilation album
- Contributed "Windmills of My Mind" to a limited 7-inch vinyl commemorating the 10th anniversary of Nero magazine (2022)
- Cornelius Live at ICC Kyoto 2023 (Cassette Tape), includes a live recording of the “AMBIENT KYOTO 2023 presents Cornelius Dream In Dream Special Live Set” (2024)
- Crafted sounds for The Ambient Machine – Cornelius Edition, a collaboration with Yuri Suzuki (2024)
- Composed the show music for kolor Autumn Winter 2025-26 Runway Show (2025)
- Cornelius×U-zhaan "You & I" (2025)
- HALFBY feat. Cornelius "Sleep Machine" (2025)
- THE AMBIENT MACHINE - Point by Cornelius edition, a collaboration with Yuri Suzuki (2026)
