= Sensuous =

Studio album by Cornelius
- Released: October 25, 2006
- Genre: Experimental pop
- Length: 46:53
- Label: Warner
- Producer: Keigo Oyamada

Cornelius chronology
Point (2001)	Sensuous (2006)	Mellow Waves (2017)

Singles from Sensuous
- 1. "Music" Released: August 23, 2006; 2. "Breezin'" Released: September 27, 2006; 3. "Gum" Released: May 21, 2007

Sensuous is the fifth studio album by Japanese musician Cornelius. It was released on October 25, 2006, by Warner Music Japan. In the United States, the album was released on August 24, 2007, by Everloving Records. Sensuous peaked at number eight on the Oricon Albums Chart.

== Critical reception ==
Professional ratings
Aggregate scores
Source	Rating
Metacritic	70/100
Review scores
Source	Rating
AllMusic	4/5 stars
Drowned in Sound	9/10
The Guardian	3/5 stars
The Irish Times	3/5 stars
NME	7/10
Pitchfork	7.8/10
Q	3/5 stars
Record Collector	4/5 stars
Rolling Stone	2.5/5 stars
Spin	3.5/5 stars

At Metacritic, which assigns a weighted average score out of 100 to reviews from mainstream critics, Sensuous received an average score of 70 based on 18 reviews, indicating "Generally favorable reviews".

Heather Phares of AllMusic called Sensuous "the finest expression of Cornelius' inimitable, playfully sophisticated musical language yet." Eric Harvey of Pitchfork wrote that the album "represents yet another step forward for Oyamada's unique headphone pop." He added, "It's not quite the departure that Point was from Fantasma, but it feels like a natural next step." Hardeep Phull of NME wrote that the album forewent any consistent theme for "a kaleidoscopic vision of experimental pop", adding that the album is "as befuddling as it is brilliant. Whether you dig it or not, the fact remains that there isn't anyone – and never has been – making music like this guy." Christian Hoard of Rolling Stone commented that the album is "as gleefully weird" as Cornelius's previous work, citing "blips, glitches, warm acoustic instruments, plus snatches of melody." However, he criticized the lack of "tunes", writing that none of the material is hummable.

== Track listing ==
All tracks are written by Keigo Oyamada, except where noted.

No.	Title	Writer(s)	Length
1.	"Sensuous"		4:21
2.	"Fit Song"		3:59
3.	"Breezin'"		3:50
4.	"Toner"		1:32
5.	"Wataridori"		6:56
6.	"Gum"		3:45
7.	"Scum"	Oyamada; Hiromori Hayashi; John Stafford Smith; Nie Er	0:38
8.	"Omstart"	Oyamada; Eirik Glambek Bøe; Erlend Øye	4:38
9.	"Beep It"		4:02
10.	"Like a Rolling Stone"		3:28
11.	"Music"		4:52
12.	"Sleep Warm"	Alan Bergman; Marilyn Bergman; Lewis Spence	4:52
Total length:			46:53

== Personnel ==
Credits are adapted from the album's liner notes.

- Keigo Oyamada – performance, production
- Yuko Araki – drums on "Fit Song"
- Eirik Glambek Bøe – vocals on "Omstart"
- Masumi Itō – photography
- Masakazu Kitayama – sleeve design
- Toyoaki Mishima – programming, recording
- Osamu Okada – photography
- Erlend Øye – vocals on "Omstart"
- Tohru Takayama – mastering, mixing

== Charts ==
Chart (2006–2007)	Peak position
Japanese Albums (Oricon)	8
US Top Dance/Electronic Albums (Billboard)	18
