= Holiday in the Sun =

Holiday(s) in the Sun may refer to:

- Holidays in the Sun (album), by Yui
- Holidays in the Sun (EP), by Cornelius
- Holiday in the Sun (film), starring Mary-Kate and Ashley Olsen
- "Holidays in the Sun" (song), by the Sex Pistols
- "Holiday in the Sun", a song by Pennywise from From the Ashes
- Holidays in the Sun, the original name of Rebellion Festival, a British punk rock music festival
