= The Jack Moves =

American musical duo

- Origin: Newark, New Jersey, U.S.
- Genres: R&B; soul; funk; disco
- Years active: 2012–present
- Labels: Everloving (current); Wax Poetics (former)
- Members: Zee Desmondes; Teddy Powell
- Website: www.thejackmoves.com

The Jack Moves is an American soul and R&B duo from Newark, New Jersey in 2012, consisting of singer and songwriter Zee Desmondes and producer/multi-instrumentalist Teddy Powell. The duo draws inspiration from a wide range of influences, including 1970s soul, funk, and hip-hop, blending them into a sound that is both nostalgic and contemporary.

== Career ==
=== The Jack Moves (2015) ===
The Jack Moves released their self-titled debut album in 2015 through Wax Poetics. The album was praised for its seamless combination of retro soul influences with modern production aesthetics. It introduced the duo's signature sound, blending skate-punk culture with seaside soul, drawing on the duality of life in their native Newark. The album featured standout tracks like "Doublin' Down," which gained attention for its catchy hooks and smooth production.

=== Free Money (2018) ===
In 2018, The Jack Moves released their sophomore album Free Money under Everloving Records. The album marked the duo's growth, continuing their exploration of soul with a stronger focus on funk and R&B elements. Free Money was well-received, with radio station KCRW naming it one of the best albums of the year. Songs like "Money Clouds" and "Red Lights" were praised for their smooth vocals, funky bass lines, and modern take on classic sounds.

=== Cruiserweight (2022) ===
The Jack Moves released their third album, Cruiserweight, in 2022 through Everloving Records. Described as their most cinematic and cohesive project to date, the album delves deeper into their Newark roots while incorporating influences from the golden age of soul and funk. Songs like "Lionel Richie," "Seabra," and "Biblical Technology" reflect a broader sonic palette, blending 1980s funk, Philly soul, and symphonic arrangements. Cruiserweight received critical acclaim for its sophisticated production and storytelling, with the legendary Paul Kyser dubbing them "the baddest band in New York City."

== Discography ==
=== Studio albums ===
- The Jack Moves (2015)
- Free Money (2018)
- Cruiserweight (2022)

=== Guest appearances ===
List of guest appearances, with other performing artists, showing year released and album name
| Title | Year | Artist(s) | Album |
|---|---|---|---|
| "Cold Crush" | 2018 | Ghostface Killah, La the Darkman, Chris Rivers, Ras Kass | Ghost Files - Propane Tapes |
| "Remain" | 2022 | 9th Wonder, Swank, King Draft | ZION VII |

=== Music videos ===
List of music videos, with selected details
| Title | Year | Director(s) |
|---|---|---|
| "Doublin' Down" | 2014 | n/a |
| "Seasons Change" | 2015 | n/a |
| "Joyride" | 2015 | Poppie van Herwerden |
| "Make Love" | 2015 | Christian Anwander |
| "Time & Enemy" | 2016 | Mohamed Chakiri |
| "Enough Is Enough" | 2021 | Zee |
| "Somebody's Watching You" | 2022 | — |
| "Seabra" | 2022 | The Jack Moves & Poppie van Herwerden |
| "Lionel Richie" | 2022 | The Jack Moves & Pep Kim |
| "Biblical Technology" | 2023 | Olita Sommers |
| "Don't Pretend" | 2023 | Panama Brim |
