= FFFFOUND! =

Social bookmarking web site

- Website type: Social bookmarking, image sharing
- Available in: English, Japanese
- Owner: Tha Ltd.
- Creators: Yosuke Abe; Keita Kitamura
- Website: www.ffffound.com
- Registration: Optional, invitation only (Note: Registration was required for making personalized recommendations.)
- Launched: 2007; 19 years ago
- Current status: Closed in 2017; 9 years ago

FFFFOUND! was a social bookmarking that allowed registered users to share already existing images on the Internet and to receive personalized recommendations of other images. Users not registered could view these posts and the corresponding recommendations; registration was strictly by invitation. The site was established in 2007 by Yosuke Abe and Keita Kitamura of the Japanese company Tha, owned by Yugo Nakamura.

In April 2017, after a ten-year run, founder Yugo Nakamura announced on Twitter that closure of the site would take place in early May (15 May 2017).

== Operation ==
FFFFOUND! operated as a social bookmarking web site for sharing already existing images on the Internet. Based on their support of other images by means of a like button, users received personalized recommendations comprising other images. These recommendations were available to the public and may serve as artistic inspiration.

FFFFOUND! was established by Yosuke Abe and Keita Kitamura of Tha, a Japanese web development company owned by Yugo Nakamura. Since its founding in June 2007, to ensure a small but dedicated community of curators, registration was allowed strictly by invitation only. Therefore each successful user received an additional invite to "pass-on" allowing for a constrained yet controlled site to organize and manage. Nakamura avoided elements of modern web design while directing the development of the site in order to keep its appearance simple. By December 2008, the site hosted over 500,000 images.

== Reception ==
An editor of Creativity called FFFFOUND! a magnet for graphic designers at the launch of the site's beta version in 2008. Calling invitations to this release a desirable commodity, the editor praised the site's ease of use and the unpredictable nature of its algorithm for creating recommendations. Russell Davies of Campaign called social interaction on the site minimal but thought the community of users cohesive in spite of this. Louisa Pacifico of Design Week considered the small number of users constructive to the site's quality and thought that the large number of images would leave any user regularly satisfied.

== Present Day ==
Unlike many other social platforms, FFFFOUND! offered no official tool for users to export or back up their content. This limitation was heightened by a confined robots.txt configuration, which restricted large-scale archiving by services such as the Internet Archive. Independent archiving communities did try to preserve some of its content, however due to the reasons listed above, no complete archive of the platform has been fully preserved to date.
