= The First Question Award =

Studio album by Cornelius
- Released: February 25, 1994
- Genre: Shibuya-kei; orchestral pop
- Length: 52:08
- Label: Trattoria
- Producer: Keigo Oyamada

Cornelius chronology
| Holidays in the Sun (1993) | The First Question Award (1994) | 69/96 (1995) |

Singles from The First Question Award
- 1. "The Sun Is My Enemy" Released: September 1, 1993; 2. "Perfect Rainbow" Released: November 10, 1993; 3. "(You Can't Always Get) What You Want" Released: January 26, 1994; 4. "Moon Light Story" Released: June 25, 1994

Alternative cover
- LP edition

The First Question Award (ザ・ファースト・クエスチョン・アワード) is the debut solo studio album by Japanese musician Cornelius. It was released on February 25, 1994, by Trattoria Records.

The First Question Award peaked at number four on the Oricon Albums Chart. Four singles were released from the album, all of which reached the top 40 on the Oricon Singles Chart: "The Sun Is My Enemy" (number 15), "Perfect Rainbow" (number 29), "(You Can't Always Get) What You Want" (number 27), and "Moon Light Story" (number 40).

== Track listing ==
All tracks are written by Keigo Oyamada.

| No. | Title | Length |
|---|---|---|
| 1. | "The Sun Is My Enemy" | 5:47 |
| 2. | "(You Can't Always Get) What You Want" | 4:00 |
| 3. | "Silent Snow Stream" | 6:32 |
| 4. | "Perfect Rainbow" | 4:21 |
| 5. | "Bad Moon Rising" | 5:28 |
| 6. | "Cannabis" | 4:37 |
| 7. | "Raise Your Hand Together" | 6:01 |
| 8. | "The Back Door to Heaven" | 6:27 |
| 9. | "Theme from First Question Award" | 1:11 |
| 10. | "The Love Parade" | 3:34 |
| 11. | "Moon Light Story" | 4:10 |
| Total length: | | 52:08 |

== Personnel ==
Credits are adapted from the album's liner notes.

- Keigo Oyamada – vocals, guitar, arrangement

Additional musicians ("Cornelius Rock 'n' Roll Orchestral Circus")

- Toshio Araki – trumpet (tracks 1, 7)
- Asa-Chang – percussion (track 4)
- Aska Strings – strings (tracks 5, 7, 10, 11)
- Shigeo Fuchino – saxophone, flute (tracks 5, 6)
- Masato Honda – saxophone (track 9)
- Riki Imanari – synthesizer operation
- Daisuke Kawai – keyboards (tracks 2, 4–6, 9–11)
- Masahiro Kobayashi – trumpet (tracks 3, 5, 6, 8–11)
- Daisaku Kume – keyboards (tracks 1, 3, 7)
- Osamu Matsumoto – trombone (tracks 5, 6, 8)
- Mecken – bass (tracks 2, 5, 7, 9)
- Toyoaki Mishima – synthesizer
- Maki Nomiya – vocals (track 10)
- Mami Otomo – vocals (track 4)
- Masakuni Takeno – saxophone, flute (tracks 5–7)
- Yoshié Toda – drums, percussion
- Hitoshi Watanabe – bass (tracks 4, 6, 10, 11)
- Nobuo Yagi – harmonica (track 4)
- Hisashi Yoshinaga – saxophone, flute (tracks 6, 9)

Production

- Keigo Oyamada – production
- Yasunobu Arakawa – recording jammer
- Osamu Hirose – mixing (tracks 5, 9)
- Yoshiaki Katou – coordination
- Yuka Koizumi – mastering
- Ken Makimura – executive production
- Tatsuhiko Mori – mixing (track 6)
- Ken-Ichi Okeda – direction
- Ichiro Oka – recording direction
- Tohru Takayama – mixing (tracks 1–4, 7, 8, 10, 11)
- Zin Yoshida – mixing (track 1)

Design

- Contemporary Production – design
- Michio Fukuda – hair, makeup
- Shindo & Tajjiemax – photography
- Hiroko Umeyama – styling

== Charts ==
| Chart (1994) | Peak position |
|---|---|
| Japanese Albums (Oricon) | 4 |
