= Everloving Records =

Record label

Everloving Records was founded in 2003, having been Enjoy Records from 2000. With the success of Jack Johnson's debut Brushfire Fairytales the original, though defunct, Enjoy Records phoned up to reclaim their moniker. Everloving began with Jack's album, which was produced by co-founder J. P. Plunier. The company began when A&R veteran Andy Factor and Plunier partnered, after having worked together for Ben Harper. Plunier is Harper's manager and Factor was his A&R man.

Shortly after "Brushfire Fairytales", Everloving had a hit with Mad World from the film Donnie Darko. That was composed by Tears for Fears and arranged by Michael Andrews and featured the vocals of Gary Jules. It went #1 in the UK at Christmas 2003, two years after the film had come out.

Additional forays into film brought the soundtrack to "Dogtown and Z-Boys" and the score to "Me and You and Everyone We Know"

Canadian band Metric debuted on Everloving, as did Lowell George's daughter Inara George. Both were produced by Michael Andrews.

Everloving's most recent success has been with Costa Mesa psychedelic/surf rock band The Growlers. The Growlers released five studio albums on Everloving: Are You In Or Out? (2009), Hot Tropics EP (2010), Hung at Heart (2013), Gilded Pleasures EP (2013), Chinese Fountain (2014) and The Jack Moves Cruiserweight (2022)

Everloving also has management and consulting divisions.

Everloving Records discography
Artist	Album name	Release date (MM/DD/YYYY)
Jack Johnson	Brushfire Fairytales	4/12/2001
Elgin Park	Elgin Park	5/15/2001
Michael Andrews (musician)	Donnie Darko Original Score	4/2/2002
Metric	Old World Underground, Where Are You Now?	9/30/2003
Inara George	All Rise	2/25/2005
Michael Andrews (musician)	Me and you and Everyone We Know	7/12/2005
Wan Santo Condo	Wan Santo Condo	10/2/2006
Ritmo Y Canto	Ritmo Y Canto	10/2/2006
Piers Faccini	Tearing Sky	11/7/2006
Roxy Saint	Underground Personality Tapes	10/2/2006
Cornelius	Sensuous	4/24/2007
Culver City Dub Collective	Dos	7/31/2007
Cornelius	Gum (EP)	1/15/2008
Various artists	Bippp: French Synth Wave 1979-85	2/12/2008
Don Cavalli	Cryland	4/22/2008
Inara George/Van Dyke Parks	An Invitation	8/12/2008
Cornelius	Sensurround + B-Sides	9/9/2008
Herman Dune	Next Year in Zion	10/21/2008
Chris Darrow	Chris Darrow/Under My Own Disguise	3/10/2009
The Growlers	Are You In or Out?	10/6/2009
The Growlers	Hot Tropics	10/12/2010
Jack Johnson	Brushfire Fairytales (remastered)	4/12/2011
The Growlers	Gay Thoughts/Good Feelings	4\16\2011
Adanowsky	Amador	11/8/2011
Jeans Wilder	Totally	06/20/2012
Michael Andrews (musician)	Spilling a Rainbow	08/14/2012
The Growlers	Hung at Heart	01/22/2013
Don Cavalli	Temperamental	08/13/2013
The Growlers	Chinese Fountain	09/23/2014
Adam Topol	Regardless of the Dark	07/22/2016
Deepakalypse	Floating On A Sphere	07/08/2016
Super Furry Animals	Fuzzy Logic (20th anniversary edition	04/22/2017
Dana Buoy	Ice Glitter Gold	02/23/2018
Jupiter & Okwess	Kin Sonic	06/29/2018
The Jack Moves	Free Money	10/19/2018
Adam Topol	Cuando	08/02/2019
Soft Palms	Soft Palms	07/31/2020
Dana Buoy	Experiments in Plant Based Music Vol. 1	11/04/2022
The Jack Moves	Cruiserweight	10/21/2022

== See also ==
- List of record labels
