= Humanity (video game) =

- Developer: tha LTD.
- Publisher: Enhance Games
- Director: Yugo Nakamura
- Producers: Tetsuya Mizuguchi; Mark MacDonald
- Designer: Eiichiro Ishige
- Programmer: Kentaro Yama
- Artist: Yugo Nakamura
- Writers: Yugo Nakamura; Tetsuya Mizuguchi; Alexander O. Smith; Mark MacDonald
- Composer: Jemapur
- Engine: Unity
- Platforms: PlayStation 4; PlayStation 5; Windows; Xbox One; Xbox Series X/S
- Release: PS4, PS5, Windows; May 16, 2023; Xbox One, Series X/S; May 30, 2024
- Genres: Puzzle-platformer, real-time strategy
- Mode: Single-player

Humanity is a 2023 puzzle-platforming game developed by tha LTD and published by Enhance Games. The player controls a Shiba Inu with the goal of guiding crowds to a goal to solve puzzles. The game was released for PlayStation 4 and PlayStation 5, and Microsoft Windows in May 2023, with optional virtual reality support on each platform. It was released for Xbox One and Xbox Series X/S in May 2024.

== Gameplay ==
Each command is visually illustrated by a circle with an arrow on it.

Humanity is a puzzle-platforming game with real-time strategy elements. Each stage is a unique puzzle where the player guides humans as an ethereal Shiba Inu to a goal. The player runs around the stage, with the crowd of humans mirroring their actions. The player can place actions at any point, which commands the humans to do a specific thing, such as turn, or shoot. There are optional objectives in each level, where players can to collect giant gold beings. Later in the game, the player unlocks new directives like jump, dive or swim.

The game additionally includes a level editor where the player can construct stages to share with others online.

== Development ==
Humanity was developed by tha, a creative firm based in Japan that has worked on experimental art installations to a redesign of Tokyo's public toilets. The title started as a creative challenge to see, "How many digital people can we put on a screen at once?". Once the demo was created, tha presented it at the Unity Festival to a panel of judges, one of which was Tetsuya Mizuguchi. Following the presentation, Mizuguchi's studio/publishing outlet, Enhance started collaborating with tha. Mizugiuchi later stated, "I felt like if I give this person the tools and resources to make a game, he already has the core sensibilities to do that. I saw in his mannerism and eyes that he was not going to give up on this opportunity."

Nakamura took inspiration from the movements of groups at conventions, "My first eureka moment was when I saw huge crowds of people at Comic Market (Comiket) in Japan, all properly lined up and waiting patiently. I was fascinated by how the movement of that many people was so controlled and regulated – I think this sort of behavior is unique to humans who are not just herded by instinct".

Mizugiuchi became an executive producer on Humanity, while Yugo Nakamura directed. For visuals Nakamura focused on mixing cel-shaded humans with brutalist architecture. The game started full development in 2018, and was released on May 16, 2023.

== Reception ==
Reception

Aggregate score
Aggregator	Score
Metacritic	(PS5) 86/100 (PC) 84/100

Review scores
Publication	Score
Edge	9/10
Eurogamer	4/5
Game Informer	8.5/10
GameSpot	8/10
IGN	9/10
Polygon	Recommended
Push Square	8/10
Shacknews	9/10
Video Games Chronicle	4/5

Humanity received "generally favorable reviews", according to review aggregator website Metacritic.

Eurogamer praised the way the title raised the stakes throughout the campaign, alongside the content offered outside of it, "there's a level editor, which is terrifyingly powerful, and a near-endless supply of user-made levels to work through, many of which require thinking that is utterly, hopelessly beyond me". The Verge enjoyed the variety of mechanics present, "Humanity's campaign spans 90 levels, and it feels like it's throwing new concepts and ideas at you until the very end".

Game Informer felt the game's puzzles could be immensely satisfying to solve, "I often felt there was no way Humanity could up the ante as I marveled at my solution after spending more than 30 minutes on the most complex trials... And each time, I go from, "There's just no way I can figure this out," to feeling omnipotent 30 minutes later". IGN liked the secondary objectives present in the game, saying that they were, "never a drag since they were never overly tricky to find or unlock, usually just adding extra layers of satisfactory challenge while giving more experience points along the way".

Edge praised the campaign's willingness to reinvent itself, writing, "It is hard to recall another game that actively changes genre partway through, and not only once". Polygon enjoyed the way Humanity left its themes up to the player's conclusions, "For all the visual and auditory presence of humanity, what the player should make of the infinite collective is left up to interpretation".

=== Awards ===
Year	Ceremony	Category	Result	Ref.
2023	Golden Joystick Awards	PlayStation Game of the Year	Nominated	
2023	The Game Awards 2023	Best VR/AR Game	Nominated	
2024	New York Game Awards	Coney Island Dreamland Award for Best AR/VR Game	Nominated	
2024	24th Game Developers Choice Awards	Best Audio	Honorable mention	
