= 69/96 =

Studio album by Cornelius
- Released: November 1, 1995
- Genre: Shibuya-kei
- Length: 72:00
- Label: Trattoria
- Producer: Keigo Oyamada

Cornelius chronology
The First Question Award (1994)	69/96 (1995)	96/69 (1996)

Singles from 69/96
- 1. "Moon Walk" Released: October 16, 1995

Alternative cover
- Limited edition

Professional ratings
Review scores
Source	Rating
AllMusic	4/5 stars

69/96 is the second studio album by Japanese musician Cornelius. It was released on November 1, 1995, by Trattoria Records. The album peaked at number three on the Oricon Albums Chart. A remix album titled 96/69 was released the following year.

== Track listing ==
All lyrics are written by Keigo Oyamada and Bryan Burton-Lewis, except where noted; all music is composed by Oyamada.

No.	Title	Lyrics	Length
1.	"69/96 a Space Odyssey: Prelude (In Atami)"		1:20
2.	"Moon Walk"		5:31
3.	"Brand New Season"		5:18
4.	"Volunteer Ape Man (Disco)"		5:27
5.	"1969 (Case of Monsieur Kamayatsu)"		0:22
6.	"How Do You Feel?"	Yasuharu Konishi	5:47
7.	"1969"		4:25
8.	"Last Night in Africa"		5:10
9.	"1996"		1:03
10.	"Blow My Mind"		3:20
11.	"69/96 Girl Meets Cassette"		4:17
12.	"Concerto No. 3 from the Four Seasons (Pink Bloody Sabbath)"		1:03
13.	"Heavy Metal Thunder"		5:55
14.	"Rock/96"		7:18
15.	"World's End Humming: Reprise (In Hawaii)"		2:27
16.	Untitled		4:08
69.	Untitled		0:33
96.	Untitled		1:18
Total length:			72:00

Notes

- Tracks 17 to 68 and 70 to 95 are silent.

== Personnel ==
Credits are adapted from the album's liner notes.

Musicians

- Keigo Oyamada – vocals, 12-string, acoustic, and electric guitars, ukulele, harp, sitar, electric sitar, kazoo, sounds, conducting, arrangement
- Asa-Chang – drums (tracks 2, 3, 8, 10, 11, 13–15), percussion (tracks 2, 6, 11, 15), noises (track 3), trumpet (track 15)
- Bonzow – drums (track 8)
- Bryan Burton-Lewis – vocals (track 9)
- Reon Daniels – vocals (track 1)
- Ellie – vocals (track 1)
- Hirohisa Horie – Hammond B-3 organ (track 2)
- Riki Imanari – sound manipulation (tracks 2–14)
- Wornell Jones – vocals (track 1)
- Monsieur Kamayatsu – vocals (track 5)
- Kahimi Karie – vocals (track 11)
- Daisuke Kawai – Wurlitzer piano (tracks 3, 14), clavinet (tracks 5, 7), Hammond B-3 organ (track 10), synthesizer (track 10)
- Kinbara Strings – strings (tracks 12, 14)
- Maki Kitada – bass (tracks 2, 3, 6, 8, 13–15)
- Toyoaki Mishima – sound manipulation (tracks 2–14)
- Masaya Nakahara – noises (tracks 2, 14)
- Takashi Ozaki – pedal steel guitar (tracks 3, 11, 15)
- Pink Sabbath – noises (tracks 8, 12, 14)
- Vagabond Suzuki – bass (track 10)
- Yoshié Toda – drums (tracks 6, 10)
- Hitoshi Watanabe – bass (tracks 3, 11), bass sitar (track 6), ukulele (track 15)
- Nobuo Yagi – blues harp (track 11), harp (track 13)
- Moog Yamamoto – turntables (tracks 2, 3, 6, 8–10, 13, 14)
- Sugar Yoshinaga – TB-303 synthesizer and electric guitar (track 4)

Production

- Keigo Oyamada – production
- Yuka Koizumi – mastering
- Ken Makimura – executive production
- Ichiro Oka – production direction and management
- Michifumi Onodera – mixing (assistant), recording (assistant)
- Tohru Takayama – mixing (tracks 1–3, 5–15), recording
- Shojiro Watanabe – mixing (track 4)

Design

- Keigo Oyamada – art direction, artwork concept, photography
- Gen Inaba – photography
- Kahimi Karie – photography
- Masakazu Kitayama – design
- Masaya Nakahara – T-shirt design
- Akemi Nakano – face painting
- Hiroshi Nomura – photography
- Mitsuo Shindō – art direction, artwork concept
- Skate Thing – T-shirt design
- Hiroko Umeyama – props

== Charts ==
Chart (1995–1996)	Peak position
Japanese Albums (Oricon)	3
