= 96/69 =

Remix album by Cornelius
- Released: June 9, 1996
- Genre: Shibuya-kei
- Length: 69:00
- Label: Trattoria
- Producer: Keigo Oyamada

Cornelius chronology
69/96 (1995)	96/69 (1996)	Fantasma (1997)

Alternative cover
- Limited edition

Professional ratings
Review scores
Source	Rating
AllMusic	2/5 stars

96/69 is the first remix album by Japanese musician Cornelius. It was released on June 9, 1996 by Trattoria Records. The album is a companion to Cornelius' second studio album 69/96, which was released the previous year. 96/69 peaked at number six on the Oricon Albums Chart.

== Track listing ==
No.	Title	Remixer(s)	Length
1.	"69/96 a Space Odyssey: Prelude (In Atami)"	Yasuyuki Okamura	4:05
2.	"Moon Walk"	Yoshinori Sunahara	7:15
3.	"Brand New Season"	Omoide Hatoba	5:11
4.	"Volunteer Ape Man (Disco)"	Takkyu Ishino	7:06
5.	"1969"	Scha Dara Parr; King 3K; Kent Deli-Cuts	5:12
6.	"69/96 Girl Meets Cassette"	Citrus	4:48
7.	"Volunteer Ape Man (Disco)"	Violent Onsen Geisha	10:09
8.	"Concerto No. 3 from the Four Seasons (Pink Bloody Sabbath)"	Do-Ku-To-Rai	1:00
9.	"Heavy Metal Thunder"	hide	4:24
10.	"World's End Humming: Reprise (In Hawaii)"	Yasuharu Konishi; Hiroshi Wada & Mahina Stars	4:31
69.	Untitled		2:49
96.	Untitled		2:29
Total length:			69:00

Notes

- Tracks 11 to 68 and 70 to 95 are silent.

== Personnel ==
Credits are adapted from the album's liner notes.

- Keigo Oyamada – production
- Masakazu Kitayama – design
- Yuka Koizumi – mastering
- Ken Makimura – executive production
- Ichiro Oka – direction
- Mitsuo Shindō – art direction
- Terumasa Yabushita – direction

== Charts ==
Chart (1996)	Peak position
Japanese Albums (Oricon)	6
