= Quick Japan =

Japanese entertainment magazine

- Categories: Subculture
- Frequency: Bimonthly
- Publisher: Ohta Publishing
- Founder: Yuichi Akada
- First issue: 1994
- Country: Japan
- Language: Japanese

Quick Japan (クイック・ジャパン, abbreviated to QJ) is a Japanese bimonthly magazine covering subcultures, published by Ohta Publishing.

Its target audience is people in their 20s and 30s who are looking for trends, with topics ranging from anime, manga, music, comedy, television, movies, internet, and street culture.

== History ==
The magazine was founded by its first editor-in-chief Yuichi Akada in 1994.

In 2005, the record label Quick Japan Records was launched, releasing the album MOGY-TV by Junichi Mogi.

In 2016, with the arrival of sixth editor-in-chief Junpei Tsukigi, the magazine adopted the slogan "Voice of a New Generation."

On January 15, 2020, the online version Quick Japan Web (abbreviated to QJ Web) was launched in partnership with Toko Ai.

In a 1995 interview with Quick Japan, as well as in a 1994 interview with Rockin'On Japan, Keigo Oyamada recounted how he bullied his schoolmates with disabilities during most of his school years. In 2021, the interviews resurfaced, causing controversy; he resigned as a musician for the opening ceremony of the Tokyo Summer Olympics and issued an apology. He later explained that he was not the main perpetrator of the abuse and was only an observer, criticizing Quick Japan's decision to publish an article on bullying as its main topic. In response, the magazine apologized and stated that they would "review the editorial department's verification system," postponing issue 157 of August 2021.
