= Casual Acquaintances =

Compilation album by The Growlers
- Released: July 27, 2018
- Recorded: April–May 2018
- Genre: Lo-fi; alternative pop; surf rock
- Length: 30:32
- Label: Beach Goth

The Growlers chronology
City Club (2016)	Casual Acquaintances (2018)	Natural Affairs (2019)

Casual Acquaintances is a compilation album by American rock band The Growlers. The album was released on July 27, 2018 through Beach Goth Records. It contains out-take and B-sides from their fifth studio album, City Club.

== Track listing ==
No.	Title	Length
1.	"Nevaeh"	0:47
2.	"Problems III"	3:34
3.	"Heaven in Hell"	3:42
4.	"Pavement and the Boot"	3:22
5.	"Decoy Face"	3:21
6.	"Orgasm of Death"	3:56
7.	"Drop Your Phone in the Sink"	2:42
8.	"Thing for Trouble"	3:08
9.	"Last Cabaret"	3:16
10.	"Casual Acquaintances"	2:44
Total length:		30:32

== Who Loves the Scum – Single ==
A single released not long after the album, most likely a demo along with its b-side from the same sessions as Casual Acquaintances.

No.	Title	Length
1.	"Who Loves the Scum?"	3:25
2.	"End of the World"	2:59

Professional ratings
Review scores
Source	Rating
All Things Loud	8/10
Alt Citizen	Positive
College Media Network	Positive
