= The Growlers =

American band

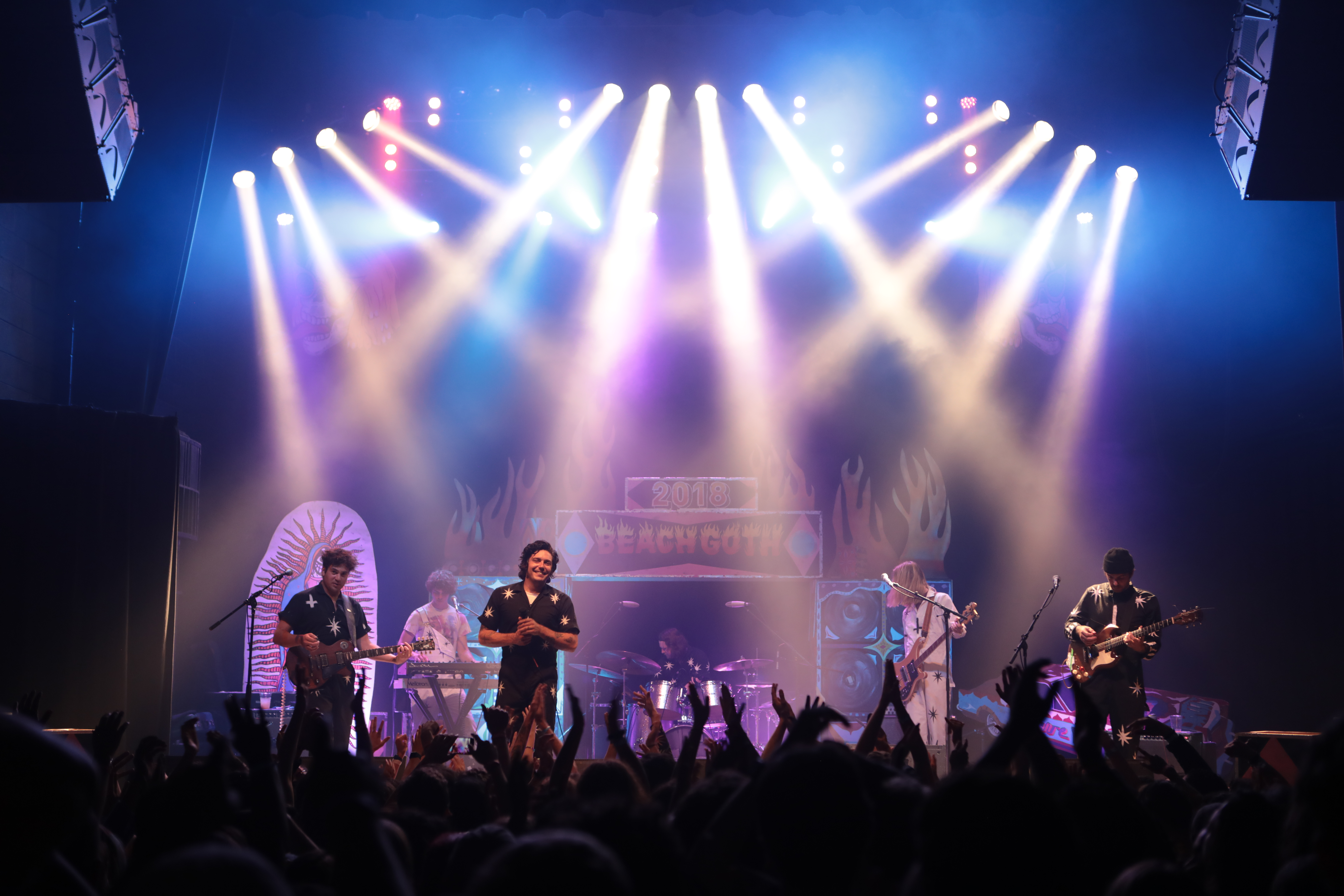
- The Growlers playing at Beach Goth 2018

Background information
- Origin: Dana Point, California, U.S.
- Genres: Surf rock, psychedelic rock, garage rock
- Years active: 2006–present
- Labels: Beach Goth Records and Tapes; Cult Records; Everloving Records; Burger Records; FatCat Records; Palmist; Ayo Silver!; Smack Face
- Members: Brooks Nielsen; Richard Gowen; JD Carrera; Cole Riddle; Max Kaplan; Thomas Hunter
- Past members: Brian Stewart; Warren Thomas; Patrick Palomo; Clark Davison; Miles Patterson; Scott Montoya; Anthony Braun Perry; Jason Kaiser; Hans Nusslock; Adam Walcott Smith; Matt Taylor; Kyle Straka; Brad Bowers; Nick Murray
- Website: thegrowlers.com

The Growlers is an American band from southern California. They began their career in the Orange County city of Dana Point, California in 2006. They are currently based in Costa Mesa. The band is currently composed of singer Brooks Nielsen, guitarist JD Carrera, keyboardist Cole Riddle, drummer Richard Gowen, bassist Max Kaplan, and guitarist Thomas Hunter. They have released seven albums, several EPs and a number of singles. The band's sound has been described as "a trademark style of music that somehow combines surf, pop, rock and beat" which has been labeled "Beach Goth".

== History ==
Singer Brooks Nielsen and music director/guitarist Matt Taylor met in middle school in the beach town of Dana Point, California, bonding over surfing, skating, and partying. When offered the chance to perform at a house party, the duo quickly wrote their first six songs in a single day, leading to the first incarnation of the band that would eventually become The Growlers, which consisted of Nielsen and Taylor, along with Clark Davidson on keys, and Brian Stewart on drums.

After Davidson left the band in 2007, being replaced by Miles Patterson, and adding Scott Montoya as the bands' bassist/producer, they released a handful of self-recorded cassettes and CDs, before issuing their first studio album, Are You in or Out?, in 2009 on Everloving Records. Aquarium Drunkard described it as "consistent in sound and tone that is as enjoyable straight through or on shuffle… Taken as a whole, the record is a beautiful mix of late 60's freak-out, folk calmness and surf rock." Their second album, Hot Tropics, was released in 2010, also on Everloving Records, and was the first to feature Keyboardist/Guitarist Kyle Straka, who had replaced Miles Patterson in 2009. The band's third album, Hung at Heart, was released in 2013, and was the first to feature Anthony Braun Perry on bass, Jason Kaiser on percussion, and see Scott Montoya move to drums, replacing Brian Stewart, who left the band in 2011.. The band originally worked with Dan Auerbach to record the album, but the finished version never saw official release. Instead the band recorded a new version of the album in Costa Mesa, CA with Mike McHugh at his Distillery Recording Studio, to get a more lo-fi sound.

Chinese Fountain, their new "more grown up, well polished" album was released September 23, 2014. This album was produced by JP Plunier at Seahorse Studios in Los Angeles, CA. While touring the album, the band expanded their live band with percussionist Nick Murray.

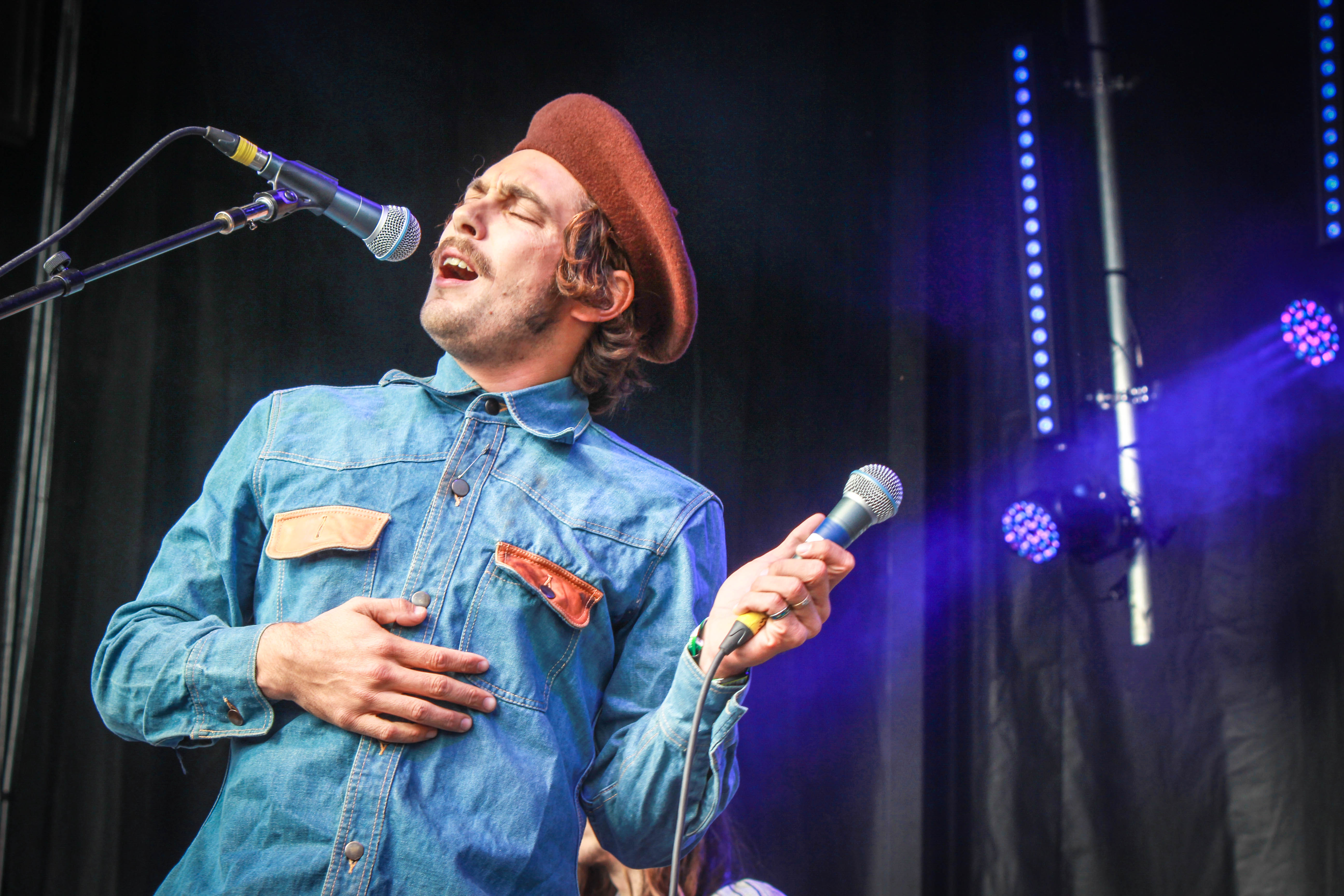
Brooks Nielsen performs with the Growlers in 2014

The band's fifth studio album, City Club was released by Cult Records on September 30, 2016, while they embarked on a supporting tour in the same month. It was the first Growlers album to be credited solely to Brooks Nielsen and Matt Taylor, as opposed to the whole band. Nielsen and Taylor wrote and recorded demos for the album over a span of two to three months with the help of Kyle Mullarky at his studio in Topanga Canyon, CA. It was preceded by the title track as a single produced by Julian Casablancas, who also owns the label. Neither drummer Scott Montoya nor bass player Anthony Perry feature on the album. On September 25, the band confirmed Montoya's departure from the band and stated that Perry was set to return in the near future. The band toured for this album with Brad Bowers on bass, Adam Wolcott Smith on keyboard, and Richard Gowen on drums.

The band released Casual Acquaintances on July 27, 2018, a collection of demos and unused material from the City Club sessions.

The Growlers have toured with artists such as The Black Keys, Devendra Banhart, Julian Casablancas, Night Beats, and Jonathan Richman. They have also appeared at numerous festivals including Coachella, Bonnaroo, Primavera Sound, Lollapalooza, Austin City Limits, Sasquatch!, Wakarusa, Treasure Island, Fun Fun Fun Fest, Bestival, Way Out West, End of The Road, Burgerama III, Rock in Rio and Outside Lands.

== Beach Goth ==
The band has organized their annual Beach Goth festival since 2012. The event typically features performances by bands representing a variety of genres, including pop, rap, hip hop, heavy metal, and rock. Over the years, the event has included costume contests, amusement park rides, and live performances of Rocky Horror Picture Show. The Growlers have headlined both Saturday and Sunday night of the annual Beach Goth festival since its inception.

The likes of Die Antwoord, Grimes, Gucci Mane, Julian Casablancas of The Strokes, Mac DeMarco, The Drums, Foxygen, White Arrows and Ghost have appeared at the festival.

Beach Goth 4 (October 2015) was hosted by Pauly Shore and featured live performances of Rocky Horror Picture Show throughout the weekend as well as a performance of The Doors song "People Are Strange" by The Growlers and Julian Casablancas.

The 2016 edition of Beach Goth took place at The Observatory in Santa Ana, CA on October 23–24, 2016. It was originally scheduled to take place at the Oak Canyon Park but was moved last minute due to unexplained circumstances. The festival's lineup included Bon Iver, TLC, James Blake, 2 Live Crew, Violent Femmes, Future Islands, Reel Big Fish, The Faint, the Pharcyde, Leftöver Crack, and DJ Quik. While it was hailed a success, the outdoor festival suffered from rain and resultant street flooding. This caused the Growlers to delay their own set due to equipment damage. In the aftermath, the band issued an apology.

Due to an ongoing lawsuit with Noise Group, owners of The Observatory venue, over the Beach Goth trademark,. As a response, 2017's succeeding festival took on the name "The Growlers Six", and took place on October 28 & 29 at the LA Waterfront. The festival included artists such as the Yeah Yeah Yeahs, Modest Mouse, and the Butthole Surfers.

The Growlers returned to their trademarked "Beach Goth" brand name for the 7th annual festival, taking place at the Los Angeles State Historic Park on August 5, 2018. Beach Goth 7 hosted performances by Jonathan Richman, The Voidz, The Drums, La Luz, and Gwar.

== Brooks Nielsen solo career ==
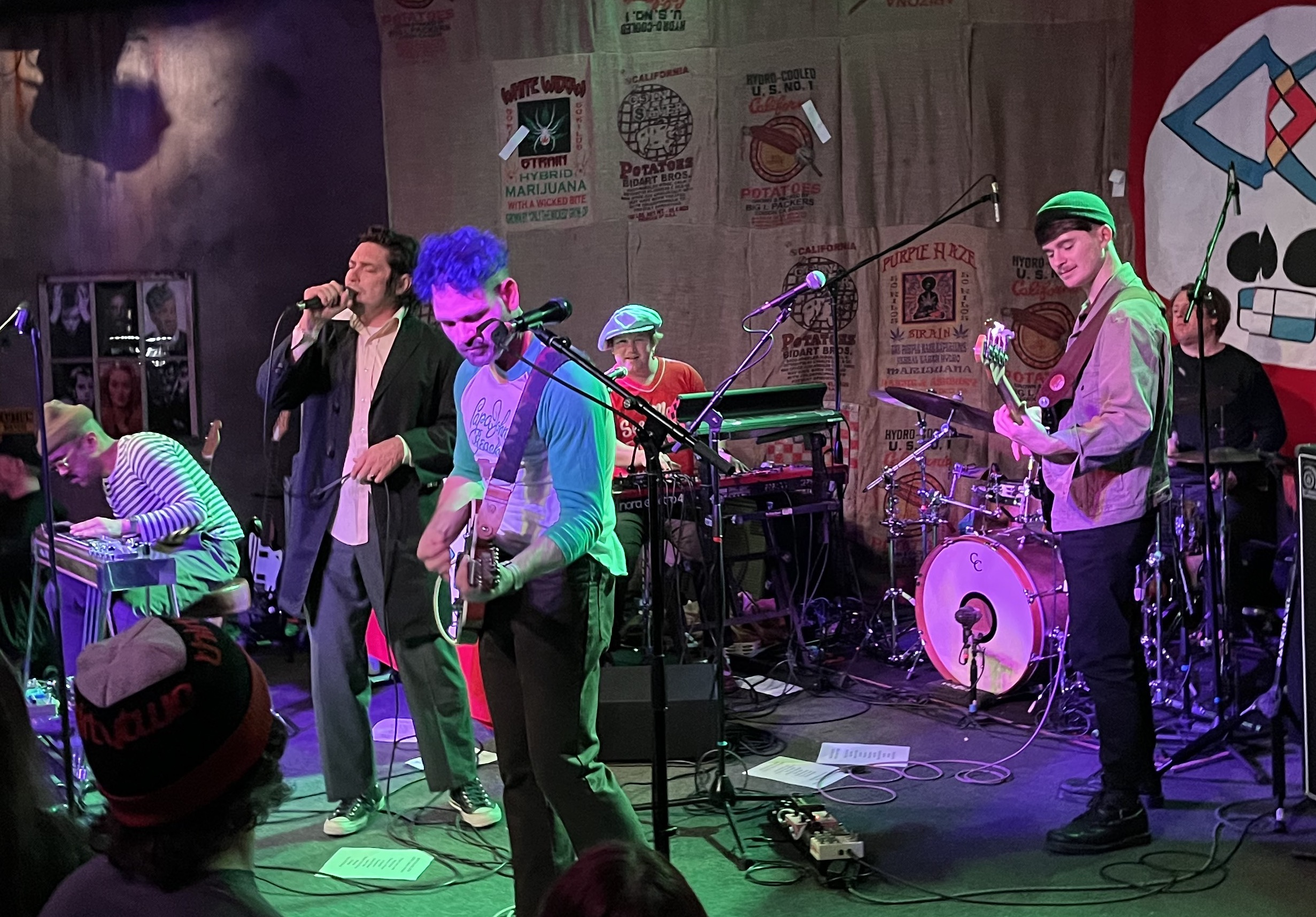
Nielsen with a new band touring his solo album in 2023

In 2022, Brooks Nielsen released a solo album, titled One Match Left, which he toured into the next year.

In 2024, Nielsen released A Ride I'm Waiting For. He included songs from this album on tours starting in February of that year. He also released the album The Circle, Psycho & John Jones, which included the new single "John Jones".

Nielsen's third studio album, Grain of Dirt, was released in 2025.

== Allegations of sexual misconduct ==
In July 2020, several allegations of sexual misconduct surfaced against the band, along with other artists associated with the Southern California surf and garage rock music scene, including many artists signed with their parent label, Burger Records.

Arrow de Wilde, the lead singer of the L.A. rock band Starcrawler, shared a personal encounter on her Instagram page. In her post, de Wilde stated she was assaulted by a male stripper hired by The Growlers while they were on tour together in Melbourne, Australia. She said her bandmates were locked out of the dressing room while the assault took place, and that while none of the members of The Growlers directly participated in the assault, they alledgely laughed and filmed the incident, in which de Wilde repeatedly attempted to leave but was held down. Starcrawler guitarist Henri Cash later made a statement backing up de Wilde's claims, stating that the band had tried to enter the dressing room where the incident took place. In a statement issued via Instagram on July 31, 2020, Growlers singer Brooks Nielsen took "full responsibility and accountability for the behavior of all Growlers' band members, past and present," and announced that Matt Taylor would temporarily leave the band.

The next day after Matt Taylor's dismissal, despite admitting to no knowledge of abuse within the band since joining in 2016, Growlers’ touring keyboardist Adam Wolcott Smith admitted to a 2017 incident of sexual abuse in an Instagram post's comment section and his second following post. The alleged abuse happened while Smith was on tour with his band Zen Mother in 2017, involving his then-girlfriend and an intoxicated person. Smith resigned from The Growlers the same day.

== Discography ==
=== Studio albums ===
- Are You In or Out? (2009), Everloving Records
- Hot Tropics (2010), Everloving Records
- Hung at Heart (2013), Everloving Records (US), FatCat Records (UK & Europe), Smack Face Records (Australia & New Zealand)
- Chinese Fountain (2014), Everloving Records (US), FatCat Records (UK & Europe), Smack Face Records (Australia & New Zealand)
- City Club (2016), Cult Records (US/EU)
- Natural Affairs (2019), Beach Goth Records & Tapes

=== EPs ===
- Split Growlers/Thee Ludds (2011), Palmist, limited to 500 copies
- Gay Thoughts/Uncle Sam's a Dick (2013), Ayo Silver
- Gilded Pleasures (2013), Everloving Records (US), Smack Face Records (Australia & New Zealand)
- Lonely This Christmas (2017), Beach Goth Records & Tapes
- Dream World (2020), Beach Goth Records & Tapes
- Empty Bones / Graveyard's Full (2020) Beach Goth Records & Tapes
- Feel My Funk (2025), The Growlers Records
- Crisis (2025), The Growlers Records
- Unordinary (2026 (recorded circa 2013)), The Growlers Records

=== Other releases ===
- Greatest sHits (2007), self-released
- Casual Acquaintances (2018) Beach Goth Records & Tapes (US)

=== Singles ===
- "Gay Thoughts" / "Feeling Good" (2011), Everloving, limited to 1000 copies on 7" vinyl
- "Uncle Sam's a Dick" / "Drinking Song for Kids" (2012), no label, limited to 500 copies, of which 250 each were sold online and at concerts on 7" vinyl
- "Late Bloomers" (2017), Cult Records LLC
- "Monotonia" (2017), Beach Goth Records & Tapes
- "California" (2017), Beach Goth Records & Tapes
- "Who Loves The Scum?" (2018), Beach Goth Records & Tapes
- "Natural Affair" (2019), Beach Goth Records & Tapes
- "Foghorn Town" (2019), Beach Goth Records & Tapes
- "Try Hard Fool" (2019), Beach Goth Records & Tapes
- "Pulp Of Youth" (2019), Beach Goth Records & Tapes
