= Fantasma (Cornelius album) =

Studio album by Cornelius
- Released: August 6, 1997
- Recorded: 1996–1997
- Genre: Shibuya-kei
- Length: 50:04
- Label: Trattoria
- Producer: Keigo Oyamada

Cornelius chronology
96/69 (1996)	Fantasma (1997)	Point (2001)

Singles from Fantasma
- 1. "Star Fruits Surf Rider" Released: July 2, 1997; 2. "Free Fall" Released: February 23, 1998; 3. "Chapter 8 – Seashore and Horizon –" Released: May 25, 1998

Fantasma is the third studio album by Japanese musician Cornelius, released on August 6, 1997, on his label Trattoria. Cornelius envisioned the album as "a one-on-one experience between the music and the listener. ... It starts with you entering into the journey and ends with you returning to reality." It peaked at number six on the Oricon Albums Chart and number 37 on the UK Independent Albums Chart. Three singles were issued from the album: "Star Fruits Surf Rider", "Free Fall", and "Chapter 8 – Seashore and Horizon –".

Fantasma was initially received with mixed reviews, but drew more praise in later years as one of the defining works of Shibuya-kei. Critic W. David Marx described Fantasma as "an important textbook for an alternative musical history where Bach, Bacharach, and the Beach Boys stands as the great triumvirate."

The Japanese edition of Rolling Stone ranked Fantasma number 10 on its list of the "100 Greatest Japanese Rock Albums of All Time".

== Production ==
The tracks on Fantasma were written and recorded in the same order they appear on the album, and were produced on magnetic digital reel tape recorders. Cornelius's goal in creating Fantasma was "to take the listener on a personal trip"; he envisioned the album as "a one-on-one experience between the music and the listener. ... It starts with you entering into the journey and ends with you returning to reality." Almost all of the tracks were named after existing bands, including Count Five, the Clash, and Microdisney. Buffalo Daughter's Moog Yamamoto appeared on "Mic Check" and "2010". The Apples in Stereo's Robert Schneider and Hilarie Sidney co-wrote and performed on "Chapter 8 – Seashore and Horizon –", while the High Llamas' Sean O'Hagan (formerly of Microdisney) appeared on "Thank You for the Music".

Fantasma contains numerous homages to Brian Wilson and the Beach Boys' 1966 release Pet Sounds. The album had recently seen a resurgence of interest among musicians and critics, and during the making of Fantasma, Oyamada had read a biography about Wilson. The title track (which is previewed at the beginning of "Mic Check") musically resembles the Beach Boys' hymn "Our Prayer", while "God Only Knows" was named after their song of the same title. The liner notes of Fantasma also include photos of Oyamada recreating two iconic photographs of Wilson from the Pet Sounds era, with Oyamada posing and dressing as Wilson did in the original photos. Historian Michael Roberts writes, "As the image makes clear, it's the figure of Wilson as producer, as much as musician, that haunts Fantasma and its central trope of the recording studio."

== Release ==
In Japan, the limited edition of Fantasma, which was packaged with stereo earphones, was released via Cornelius's own label Trattoria Records on August 6, 1997. The standard edition of the album was released on September 3, 1997. Fantasma peaked at number six on the Oricon Albums Chart. On March 24, 1998, Fantasma was released in North America and Europe via Matador Records. Due to sample clearance issues, "Monkey" was retitled "Magoo Opening", the same title as the sampled song, and relisted as a cover version. Fantasma peaked at number 37 on the UK Independent Albums Chart. As of 2006, the album had sold more than 300,000 copies worldwide.

Two companion remix albums, FM and CM, were released on November 26, 1998. The former is composed of remixes of Fantasma tracks by Money Mark, the High Llamas, Buffalo Daughter, the Pastels, Damon Albarn of Blur, Unkle, and Coldcut. The latter is composed of remixes by Cornelius of tracks by most of the artists that contributed to FM. FM reached number 39 and CM reached number 40 on the Oricon Albums Chart.

== Critical reception ==
Professional ratings
Review scores
Source	Rating
AllMusic	4.5/5 stars
The Baltimore Sun	3.5/4 stars
Exclaim!	9/10
Pitchfork	8.8/10
Q	4/5 stars
Rolling Stone	3.5/5 stars
Select	4/5
Spin	6/10
The Times	9/10
Uncut	5/5 stars

AllMusic critic Stephen Thomas Erlewine praised Fantasma as "one of those rare records where you can't tell what's going to happen next, and it leaves you hungry for more." Simon Lewis of Uncut lauded it as "a dizzyingly eclectic collage of every trashy pop sound from the last 30 years", while Stephen Thompson of The A.V. Club said, "Fantasma is a crisp, dynamic, mostly pleasant construction that sounds like the product of one inventive man whose sounds are created and manipulated strictly within the confines of a studio setting." Billboard's Steve McClure called it "a wonderful example of how some of Japan's best pop musicians assimilate Western musical influences and combine them in original, quirky ways."

In 2007, the Japanese edition of Rolling Stone placed Fantasma at number 10 on its list of the "100 Greatest Japanese Rock Albums of All Time". In 2011, the album was included in LA Weekly's "beginner's guide" to the Shibuya-kei genre. Tokyo Weekender writer Ed Cunningham cited it in 2020 as "a pinnacle" of the genre, and "one of the best-known Shibuya-kei records outside of Japan – if anyone has heard a Shibuya-kei release, it's probably Fantasma." Reviewing the album's 2016 reissue, Patrick St. Michel of Pitchfork said that Fantasma "distills the spirit and process of Shibuya-kei down to its purest essence". Daniel Sylvester of Exclaim! wrote that "Cornelius used entire genre motifs wholesale to deliver one of the most exploratory releases of all time."

== Reissue history ==
On November 3, 2010, a remastered version of Fantasma was released via Warner Music Japan. It was remastered by Yoshinori Sunahara (a former member of Denki Groove). The limited edition includes a bonus CD and a bonus DVD.

On June 10, 2016, Fantasma was reissued in the United States, coinciding with a tour in August, including a date performing at the Eaux Claires festival. The album was released as a limited edition remastered double vinyl LP via Lefse Records and digitally released via Post Modern. The vinyl was pressed at Memphis Record Pressing.

== Track listing ==
All tracks are written by Keigo Oyamada, except where noted.

No.	Title	Writer(s)	Length
1.	"Mic Check"		3:01
2.	"The Micro Disneycal World Tour"		3:37
3.	"New Music Machine"		3:53
4.	"Clash"		5:37
5.	"Count Five or Six"		3:03
6.	"Magoo Opening" (originally titled "Monkey")	Dennis Farnon	2:08
7.	"Star Fruits Surf Rider"		5:42
8.	"Chapter 8 – Seashore and Horizon –"	Oyamada; Robert Schneider; Hilarie Sidney	3:25
9.	"Free Fall"		4:07
10.	"2010"	Oyamada; J. S. Bach (uncredited)	2:04
11.	"God Only Knows"		7:39
12.	"Thank You for the Music"		4:53
13.	"Fantasma"		0:55
Total length:			50:04

1997 limited edition bonus track
No.	Title	Length
14.	Untitled	16:48

In this hidden track, Eye of Boredoms introduces songs by three acts on his label Shock City (all of which either include him or are pseudonyms), which then play, with each one segueing into the next. In order, they are "Super Nature" by Sound Hero, "Best Brain" by Free Brain, and "Rock Fantastictac" by DJ Question; all of them only appear on this release. The preceding title track on this edition has seven minutes of silence added to the end, for a total length of 7:56.

1997 standard edition bonus tracks
No.	Title	Length
14.	"Fantasma Spot"	4:40
15.	"Fantasma" (alternate version)	0:58
16.	"Chapter 8 – Seashore and Horizon –" (demo)	2:59
17.	"Typewrite Lesson" (demo)	12:23
Total length:		71:04

2010 reissue limited edition bonus CD
No.	Title	Length
1.	"Taylor"	2:51
2.	"The Fight"	1:56
3.	"Lazy"	5:25
4.	"Ball in Kick Off"	5:18
5.	"Typewrite Lesson"	5:46
6.	"The Micro Disneycal World Tour" (High Llamas remix)	5:53
7.	"Clash" (The Pastels remix)	5:41
8.	"Count 5, 6, 7, 8" (Yasuharu Konishi remix)	4:00
9.	"Star Fruits Surf Rider" (Damon Albarn remix)	3:19
10.	"E1/2" (at Glastonbury Festival 1999/06/17)	2:42
11.	"Lazy" (BBC live version)	5:46
12.	"Ball in Kick Off" (BBC live version)	4:57
13.	"Chapter 8 – Seashore and Horizon –" (demo)	2:59
14.	"Fantasma Spot"	4:10
15.	"Fantasma" (alternate version)	0:55
16.	"Fantasma Spot B" (by Hibiki Tokiwa)	2:46
Total length:		64:24

2010 reissue limited edition bonus DVD
No.	Title	Length
1.	"Opening" (live at Budokan)
2.	"Mic Check" (live at Budokan)
3.	"The Micro Disneycal World Tour" (live at Budokan)
4.	"New Music Machine" (live at Budokan)
5.	"Clash" (live at Budokan)
6.	"Star Fruits Surf Rider" (live at Budokan)
7.	"Free Fall" (live at Budokan)
8.	"Opening" (from EUS)
9.	"Count Five or Six" (from EUS)
10.	"E" (from EUS)
11.	"Ape Shall Never Kill Ape" (from EUS)
12.	"Star Fruits Surf Rider" (from EUS)
13.	"Fantasma TV Spot" (from EUS)

2016 reissue bonus tracks
No.	Title	Length
14.	"Taylor"	2:52
15.	"Lazy"	5:25
16.	"Ball in Kick Off"	5:19
17.	"Typewrite Lesson"	5:46
Total length:		69:26

== Personnel ==
Credits are adapted from the album's liner notes.

Musicians

- Keigo Oyamada (also credited as "The Ape") – performance, arrangement
- Kazumichi Fujiwara – vocals (on "Mic Check", "Star Fruits Surf Rider" and "2010")
- Yoshié Hiragakura – drums (on "Count Five or Six", "Star Fruits Surf Rider" and "Free Fall")
- Kinbara Strings – strings (on "The Micro Disneycal World Tour", "Star Fruits Surf Rider" and "God Only Knows")
- Toyoaki Mishima – keyboards
- Sean O'Hagan – banjo, sampler, chorus (on "Thank You for the Music")
- Robert Schneider – vocals, bass (on "Chapter 8 – Seashore and Horizon –")
- Hilarie Sidney – vocals, drums (on "Chapter 8 – Seashore and Horizon –")
- Moog Yamamoto – scratching (on "Mic Check" and "2010")
- Yuki Yano – theremin (on "The Micro Disneycal World Tour")

Production

- Keigo Oyamada – production, mixing
- Toyoaki Mishima – hard disk manipulation
- Nakai-kun – assistance
- Toru Takayama – mixing, engineering

Design

- Masakazu Kitayama – artwork
- Yumi Nakamura – styling
- Akemi Nakano – styling
- Hiroshi Nomura – photography
- Mitsuo Shindō – artwork
- Hiroko Umeyama – styling

== Charts ==
Chart (1997–1998)	Peak position
Japanese Albums (Oricon)	6
UK Independent Albums (Official Charts)	37
