= City Club (album) =

Studio album by The Growlers
- Released: September 30, 2016
- Recorded: 2016
- Genre: Garage rock; synthpop; post-punk revival; new wave
- Length: 49:36
- Label: Cult Records
- Producer: Julian Casablancas, Shawn Everett

The Growlers chronology
Chinese Fountain (2014)	City Club (2016)	Casual Acquaintances (2018)

Singles from City Club
- 1. "City Club" Released: 2016; 2. "I'll Be Around" Released: 2016; 3. "Night Ride" Released: 2016

City Club is the fifth studio album by the Southern California rock band The Growlers, released on 30 September 2016 by Cult Records.

== Track listing ==
All songs by Brooks Nielsen and Matt Taylor, except "Night Ride" (Kyle Mullarky/Nielsen/Taylor) and "Blood of a Mutt" (Mullarky/Nielsen).

No.	Title	Length
1.	"City Club"	3:16
2.	"I'll Be Around"	4:47
3.	"Vacant Lot"	3:01
4.	"Night Ride"	4:11
5.	"Dope on a Rope"	4:10
6.	"When You Were Made"	3:38
7.	"Rubber & Bone"	3:54
8.	"The Daisy Chain"	3:45
9.	"World Unglued"	3:30
10.	"Neverending Line"	2:43
11.	"Too Many Times"	3:52
12.	"Blood of a Mutt"	5:26
13.	"Speed Living"	3:23
Total length:		49:36

Other Outtakes

No.	Title	Length
1.	"Late Bloomers"	3:56
2.	"Heaven and Hell"	3:38

== Critical reception ==
Professional ratings
Aggregate scores
Source	Rating
Metacritic	64/100
Review scores
Source	Rating
Allmusic	3/5 stars
Clash	7/10
Drowned In Sound	5/10

City Club received mixed to positive reviews from contemporary music critics. At Metacritic, which assigns a normalized rating out of 100 to reviews from mainstream publications, the album received an average score of 64, based on six reviews, indicating "generally favorable reviews". In a mixed review, Jack Doherty, writing for Drowned in Sound, criticized the sound of the band, saying it was outdated. Doherty said "on the whole City Club is full of the type of synth funk nonsense that should have been left alone in the late Noughties." Shannon Cotton, writing for Clash, gave a more endearing review. Cotton said the album had "a distinct retro vibe. Most of the tracks possess a nostalgic groove which wouldn’t render them out of place in an episode of the enigmatic Twin Peaks". In a mixed review, Christopher Monger, writing for AllMusic, said the album might attract new fans, but alienate long time fans, saying the album "may not be what fans were expecting, but it's by far the Growlers' most immediate and accessible collection of songs to date."

== Charts ==
Chart (2016)	Peak position
US Heatseekers Albums (Billboard)	6
