= Hung at Heart =

Hung At Heart

Studio album by The Growlers
- Released: January 22, 2013
- Recorded: April 2012
- Studio: The Distillery, Costa Mesa, CA
- Genre: Garage rock, psychedelic rock, surf rock, beach rock, Gothic rock
- Length: 48:47
- Label: Everloving Records (US); Burger Records (US); FatCat Records (UK)
- Producer: The Growlers

The Growlers chronology
Hot Tropics (2010)	Hung At Heart (2013)	Chinese Fountain (2014)

Hung at Heart is the third studio album by the Southern California surf rock band The Growlers, released on January 22, 2013 by Everloving Records. The album garnered generally positive reviews from critics, with Alejandro Rubio of Filter describing it as "a sketchy Tijuana pharmacy that's got a little “something” for everybody." The album was originally going to be produced by The Black Keys lead singer and guitarist Dan Auerbach, but due to the band's dissatisfaction with the final product, it was self-produced.

== Track listing ==
No.	Title	Length
1.	"Someday"	3:35
2.	"Naked Kids"	3:51
3.	"Salt on a Slug"	3:01
4.	"One Million Lovers"	4:42
5.	"No Need for Eyes"	3:49
6.	"Living in a Memory"	3:15
7.	"Pet Shop Eyes"	3:33
8.	"In Between"	3:08
9.	"Burden of the Captain"	3:19
10.	"Row"	3:36
11.	"It's No Use"	2:28
12.	"Use Me for Your Eggs"	2:18
13.	"Derka Blues"	2:14
14.	"Beach Rats"	4:10
15.	"The Fruit Is for Everyone"	1:38

== Chart performance ==
Chart (2013)	Peak position
US Heatseekers Albums (Billboard)	14
