= Chinese Fountain =

Studio album by The Growlers
- Released: September 23, 2014
- Recorded: 2014
- Genres: Garage rock; psychedelic rock; surf rock; beach rock
- Length: 38:45
- Label: Everloving Records

The Growlers chronology
Hung at Heart (2013)	Chinese Fountain (2014)	City Club (2016)

Chinese Fountain is the fourth studio album by the Southern California surf rock band The Growlers, released on September 23, 2014 by Everloving Records. The album received generally positive reviews from critics, with Under the Radar calling it "one of the best guitar albums of the year".

== Track listing ==
All tracks are written by Brooks Nielsen, Matt Taylor.

No.	Title	Length
1.	"Big Toe"	2:32
2.	"Black Memories"	2:51
3.	"Chinese Fountain"	4:06
4.	"Dull Boy"	3:23
5.	"Good Advice"	3:25
6.	"Going Gets Tough"	3:29
7.	"Magnificent Sadness"	3:34
8.	"Love Test"	4:09
9.	"Not the Man"	3:28
10.	"Rare Hearts"	4:45
11.	"Purgatory Drive"	3:08
Total length:		38:45

== Critical reception ==
Professional ratings
Aggregate scores
Source	Rating
Metacritic	70/100
Review scores
Source	Rating
Under the Radar	4/5 stars

At Metacritic, which assigns a normalized rating out of 100 to reviews from mainstream publications, Chinese Fountain received an average score of 70, based on six reviews, indicating "generally favorable reviews".

== Charts ==
Chart (2014)	Peak position
US Billboard 200	173
US Heatseekers Albums (Billboard)	7
US Independent Albums (Billboard)	35
US Top Rock Albums (Billboard)	49
