= Holidays in the Sun (EP) =

EP by Cornelius
- Released: September 10, 1993
- Genre: Shibuya-kei
- Length: 27:15
- Label: Trattoria
- Producer: Keigo Oyamada

Cornelius chronology
Holidays in the Sun (1993)	The First Question Award (1994)

Holidays in the Sun is the debut EP by Japanese musician Cornelius. It was released on September 10, 1993 by Trattoria Records. The EP peaked at number 13 on the Oricon Albums Chart.

== Track listing ==
All tracks are written by Keigo Oyamada.

1. "Raise Your Hand Together" (Cornelius mix) – 5:50
2. "Raise Your Hand Together" (320 Light Years mix) – 6:46
3. "Diamond Bossa" (featuring Cornelius Swingle Singers) – 3:20
4. "The Sun Is My Enemy" (long edit) – 5:49
5. "The Sun Is My Enemy" (Sunset Boo-Goo-Loo mix) – 5:30

== Charts ==
Chart (1993)	Peak position
Japanese Albums (Oricon)	13
