= Point (Cornelius album) =

Studio album by Cornelius
- Released: October 24, 2001
- Genre: Shibuya-kei
- Length: 45:27
- Label: Trattoria
- Producer: Keigo Oyamada

Cornelius chronology
Fantasma (1997)	Point (2001)	Sensuous (2006)

Singles from Point
- 1. "Point of View Point" Released: September 5, 2001; 2. "Drop" Released: October 3, 2001

Point is the fourth studio album by Japanese musician Cornelius. It was released in Japan on October 24, 2001, by Trattoria Records, and in the United States on January 22, 2002, by Matador Records. Point peaked at number four on the Oricon Albums Chart. The album was reissued on CD by Warner Music Japan in 2019 with a second disc containing the Five Point One music video collection.

== Composition ==
Drowned in Sound's Samuel Rosean described Point as a Shibuya-kei album, albeit "in only the most abstract and contextual manner", noting that its "spacey guitar and synth-heavy production" was more comparable to that of works by artists such as Stereolab and the Notwist.

== Critical reception ==
Professional ratings
Aggregate scores
Source	Rating
Metacritic	82/100
Review scores
Source	Rating
AllMusic	4/5 stars
Alternative Press	8/10
Blender	4/5 stars
Entertainment Weekly	A
The Guardian	2/5 stars
Muzik	4/5
NME	8/10
Pitchfork	7.8/10
Q	4/5 stars
Spin	7/10

At Metacritic, which assigns a weighted average score out of 100 to reviews from mainstream critics, Point received an average score of 82 based on 24 reviews, indicating "universal acclaim". Ty Burr of Entertainment Weekly described Point as "11 irresistible sound collages that feature driving beats, amiable guitar acoustics, and a quadraphonic sense of aural play that encourages rampant headphone abuse." LA Weekly's Dan Epstein found it to be a "consistently whimsical and inventive" record, while The A.V. Club's Noel Murray called it "a magnificent piece of pop architecture."

AllMusic editor Heather Phares found that while Point eschews the "stylistic about-faces" of its predecessor Fantasma, "the restraint and cohesion [Cornelius] brings to the album make its louder and crazier moments ... that much more distinctive." Blender's Alex Pappademas deemed it an improvement over Fantasma, with less "stylistic range" but a more refined pop sensibility. Fiona Sturges of The Independent found that Cornelius had "honed his cut-and-paste sensibilities into something more coherent and utterly beautiful." Nick Southall of Stylus Magazine said, "More rounded and less determinedly schizo than Fantasma, Point is a great album of delicious odd-pop made by a whimsically modest genius." Guardian critic Garry Mulholland was more critical, panning the music as "noises in search of a song, a groove or, indeed, a point."

== Music videos ==
For the album's tour, Cornelius and his band created music videos for each song, which played behind them. In The Daily Telegraph, Richard Wolfson said of the overall effect: "A Cornelius show is a blur of precision-perfect stops and starts, visual gags, unusual camera angles and sudden visceral leaps into new musical and visual styles." On July 23, 2003, the Felicity and Polystar labels released a DVD titled Five Point One containing all the songs' music videos.

== Track listing ==
All tracks are written by Keigo Oyamada, except where noted.

No.	Title	Lyrics	Music	Length
1.	"Bug (Electric Last Minute)"			0:38
2.	"Point of View Point"			3:54
3.	"Smoke"			5:48
4.	"Drop"			4:53
5.	"Another View Point"			5:35
6.	"Tone Twilight Zone"			3:39
7.	"Bird Watching at Inner Forest"			4:22
8.	"I Hate Hate"			1:43
9.	"Brazil"	Ary Barroso; Bob Russell	Barroso	3:27
10.	"Fly"			5:40
11.	"Nowhere"			5:48
Total length:				45:27

== Personnel ==
Credits are adapted from the album's liner notes.

- Keigo Oyamada – performance, production
- Masakazu Kitayama – sleeve design, photography
- Mikiko Kuwahara – violin
- Yohei Matsuoka – cello
- Toyoaki Mishima – programming, recording
- Tohru Takayama – mastering, mixing
- Ayako Ueda – viola

== Charts ==
Chart (2001–2002)	Peak position
Japanese Albums (Oricon)	4
UK Albums (Official Charts)	124
UK Independent Albums (Official Charts)	18
US Independent Albums (Billboard)	47
US Top Dance Albums (Billboard)	17
