= Yugo Nakamura =

Japanese web designer (born 1970)

- Born: Nara, Japan
- Education: The University of Tokyo
- Occupations: Creative director Interactive designer Engineer
- Website: www.yugop.com

Yugo Nakamura (中村 勇吾, Nakamura Yūgo) is a Japanese web designer.

== Early life and education ==
Yugo Nakamura was born in Nara, Japan.

He studied engineering, architecture, and landscape design.

== Career ==
Nakamara is a web designer.

He is one of the authors of New Masters Of Flash (2003). Yugo has exhibited and lectured in Asia, United States, and Europe. His artwork has been shown at Centre Pompidou in Paris, Vienna Künstlerhaus in Vienna, and the Design Museum in London.

He utilizes mathematics underlying natural complexity to create online interactions that are usable and familiar because their behavior is modeled on the natural world. He directed the 2023 video game, Humanity.

Nakamura was the owner of the web development company Tha Ltd. FFFFOUND!, a popular image bookmarking site, that was launched by the company in 2007 and was closed on May 8, 2017.

== Books and publications ==
- 2000 Big 26: Tradition – Big Magazine
- 2000 Gasbook 8 – DesignExchange
- 2000 New Master of Flash – friends of ED
- 2000 Moving Type – Digital Media Design
- 2001 WDA 2001 – GRAPHIC
- 2001 Gasbook 10 – DesignExchange
- 2001 New Master of Flash 2 – friends of ED
- 2001 72 DPI – Die Gestalten Verlag
- 2002 SPOON – Phaidon
- 2003 TIME Magazine – TIME
- 2003 JPG – Actar Editorial
- 2003 Sugo – Sugo
- 2003 +81(Vol.24) – +81
- 2004 Creative Code / John Maeda – Thames & Hudson

== Awards ==
Nakamura's commercial works have received many international awards, including Cannes Lions, One Show, Clio Awards, and NY ADC.

His awards include:

- 2001 WDA 2001 – Special Prize – Connected_Identity
- 2001 Cannes Lions – Short List – Sky Pavilion
- 2002 ACA Media Arts Festival – Excellence Prize – Sky Pavilion
- 2002 LIAA – Short List – Connected_Identity
- 2003 ACA Media Arts Festival – Excellence Prize – CAMCAMTIME
- 2003 NY ADC Distinctive Merit – CAMCAMTIME
- 2003 One Show Interactive – Gold – CAMCAMTIME
- 2003 Tokyo Interactive Ad Awards – Grand Prix – CAMCAMTIME
- 2004 Tokyo Interactive Ad Awards – Grand Prix – TRUNK
- 2004 ACA Media Arts Festival – Short List – ecotonoha
- 2004 Tokyo Interactive Ad Awards – Silver – ecotonoha
- 2004 Clio Awards – Gold – ecotonoha
- 2004 Clio Awards – Gold – ecotonoha
- 2004 LIAA – Grand Prix – ecotonoha
- 2004 One Show Interactive – Grand Clio – ecotonoha
- 2004 One Show Interactive – Best of Show – ecotonoha
- 2004 Cannes Cyber Lion – Grand Prix – ecotonoha
- 2005 One Show Interactive – Silver – FM Festival 2004
- 2005 Clio Awards – Silver – FM Festival 2004
- 2005 NY ADC Distinctive Merit – FM Festival 2004
- 2005 Tokyo Interactive Ad Awards – Gold – FM Festival 2004
- 2005 Cannes Cyber Lion – Gold – FM Festival 2004
- 2005 Prix Ars Electronica – Distinctive Merit – yugop.com
- 2006 Tokyo Interactive Ad Awards – Silver – Honda Sweet Mission
- 2006 Cannes Cyber Lion – Silver – Honda Sweet Mission
- 2006 Clio Awards – Bronze – Communication Evolved
- 2006 OneShow – Silver – Communication Evolved
- 2006 Tokyo Interactive Ad Awards – Gold – Communication Evolved
- 2006 Cannes Cyber Lion – Gold – Communication Evolved
- 2007 OneShow – Silver – UNIQLO USA
- 2007 Cannes Cyber Lion – Silver – UNIQLO USA
- 2007 Tokyo Interactive Ad Awards – Gold – UNIQLO USA
