= Yura Yura Teikoku =

Japanese alternative rock band

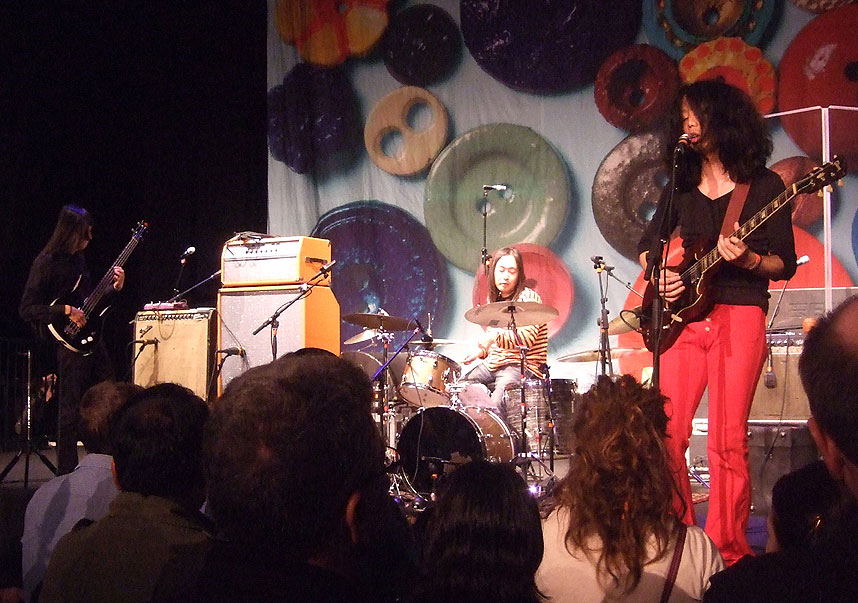
- Yura Yura Teikoku at the Wilbur Theatre, 2009

Background information
- Origin: Tokyo, Japan
- Genre: Psychedelic rock
- Years active: 1989–2010
- Labels: Captain Trip; Midi; Sony Music Entertainment; DFA; Mesh-Key
- Past members: Shintaro Sakamoto; Chiyo Kamekawa; Atsushi Yoshida; Onsen Shimoda; Ichiro Shibata
- Website: http://www.yurayurateikoku.com/

Yura Yura Teikoku (ゆらゆら帝国; literally "The Wobbling Empire") was a three-piece Japanese rock band from Tokyo, formed in 1989. Part of the city's underground music scene centered in Kōenji, their music has an eclectic sound usually described as psychedelic rock. After 21 years playing together, Yura Yura Teikoku amicably broke up in 2010.

== History ==
Yura Yura Teikoku was formed in 1989 as a quartet with drummer Atsushi Yoshida, vocalist/guitarist Shintaro Sakamoto, bassist Chiyo Kamekawa and a succession of other members. Yoshida left the band and was replaced by Onsen Shimoda, who appeared on the band's 1996 album, Are You Ra?, which was released on Captain Trip Records. In 1997, Shimoda left the band and was replaced by Ichiro Shibata to form the current lineup. Yura Yura Teikoku, as a trio, signed with Midi Records in 1998. The band released five studio albums, one live recording album and two greatest hits albums on Midi.

In 2005, Yura Yura Teikoku signed with Sony Japan and released their ninth studio album, Sweet Spot, and a remix 12-inch,"Soft Death / Frankie Teardrop" (Suicide cover). "Soft Death" was embraced by the dance community, and "Sweet Spot" was elected one of the best albums of the year in various media in Japan and overseas. The band also released a live album of material from their Midi years titled "na.ma.shi.bi.re.na.ma.me.ma.i" on New York-based Mesh-Key Records. In October of the same year, the label organized two shows for the band in New York (their first shows ever outside Japan).

In June 2006, the CD single "Into The Next Night" (つぎの夜へ, Tsugi no Yoru e) and remix 12-inch "Into The Next Night / You Can't Fight Fate" were released. In July, Mesh-Key Records released the 12-inch "Soft Death / It Was A Robot" and brought the band back for a second batch of New York shows, which were even more packed than the first. The "Soft Death" 12-inch has been championed by such deejays as Rub'N Tug and DJ Harvey.

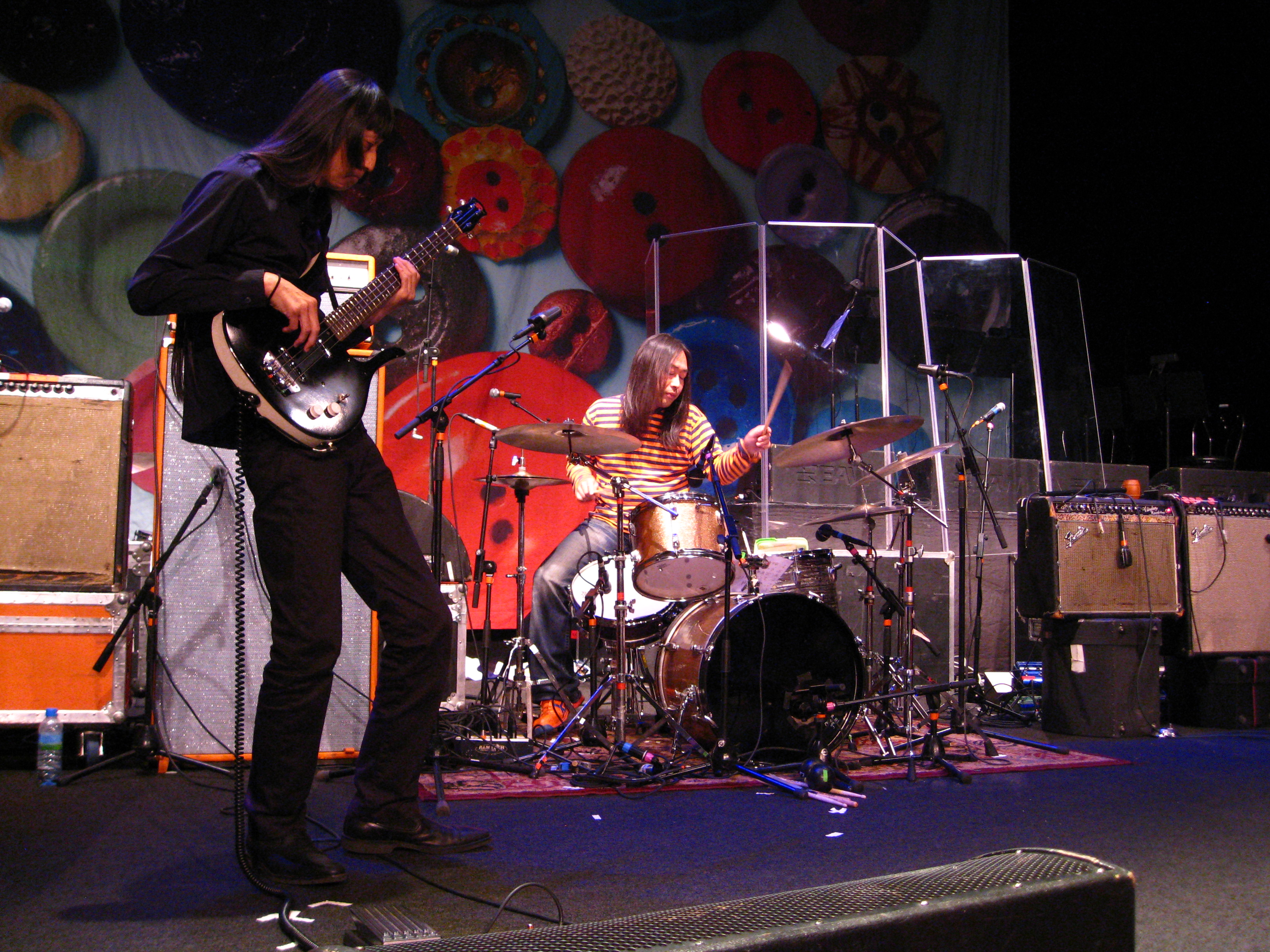
Chiyo Kamekawa and Ichiro Shibata in Boston, 2009

In 2006, the band headlined at various major festivals in Japan and Taiwan. In May 2007, Mesh-Key Records released the US version of "Sweet Spot". In the same year, Yura Yura Teikoku went on their first Australian tour. A few months later, in July, the band released the single "Beautiful" (美しい, Utsukushii), marking their first new material since "Into the Next Night". The single contained a total of four new songs and reached a peak position of 23 on the Oricon chart. In October of that year, Yura Yura Teikoku released Hollow Me (空洞です, Kūdō desu), their first studio album in two and a half years. A version of the title track was utilized as the theme song in Sion Sono's 2008 movie Love Exposure and two other songs from the Remix 2005-2008 album were featured in the film. Hollow Me was distributed in America by DFA Records in September 2009 as a special edition that included the entirey of the "Beautiful" single. The month prior, Yura Yura Teikoku toured America, with two concerts supporting Yo La Tengo.

On March 31, 2010, Yura Yura Teikoku announced that they were disbanding after 21 years together. The breakup was amicable, with the members citing a loss of excitement. The announcement stated that the band felt they had already done everything they could do and if they continued working together it would become routine.

Vocalist Shintaro Sakamoto, who designs all the band's artwork, published his first illustration/artwork anthology, "Shintaro Sakamoto Artworks 1994-2006" (Shogakukan) in July 2007. He started his own record label, Zelone Records, and released his first solo single, "In A Phantom Mood", on October 7, 2011. Bassist Chiyo Kamekawa was a member of The Stars, led by producer You Ishihara (ex-White Heaven) since 1999. They have released three studio albums. Kamekawa died on April 7, 2024 at the age of 54.

== Members ==
- Shintaro Sakamoto (坂本慎太郎) – vocals, guitar
- Chiyo Kamekawa (亀川千代) – bass guitar
- Ichiro Shibata (柴田一郎) – drums

== Discography ==
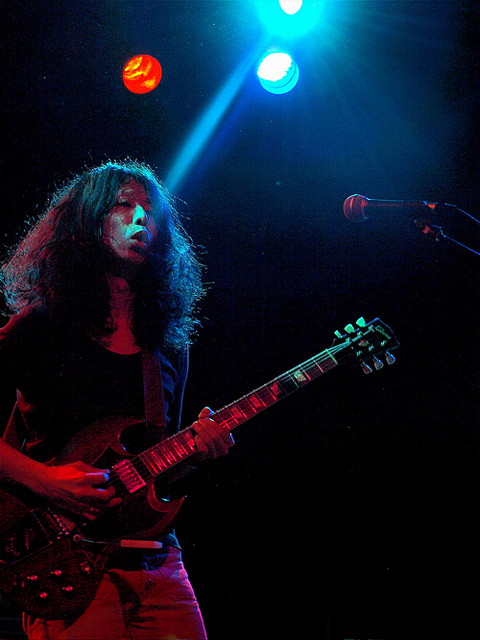
Shintaro Sakamoto in New York, 2008

=== Studio albums ===
- Yura Yura Teikoku (1992)
- Yura Yura Teikoku (1994)
- Are You Ra? (1996)
- 3×3×3 (1998)
- Me no Car (1999)
- Yura Yura Teikoku III (2001)
- Yura Yura Teikoku no Shibire (2003)
- Yura Yura Teikoku no Memai (2003)
- Sweet Spot (2005)
- Hollow Me (2007)

=== EPs ===
- Hakkoutai / Itazurakozou (1998)
- Taiyou No Shiroi Kona (1999)
- Soft Death / It Was A Robot (2006)
- Beautiful (2007)

=== Live albums ===
- Live (1995)
- Na.ma.shi.bi.re.na.ma.me.ma.i (2003)
- Live 2005-2009 (2010)

=== Singles ===
- "Hakkoutai" (1998)
- "Zukku Ni Rock" (1999)
- "Into the Next Night" (2006)
- "Dekinai" (2010)
