= Shintaro Sakamoto =

Japanese musician

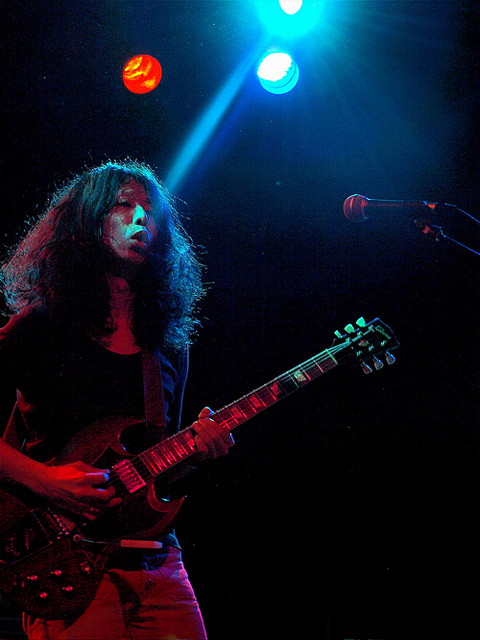
- Sakamoto performing in New York in 2008

Background information
- Born: September 9, 1967 (age 58); Osaka, Japan
- Genres: Psychedelic rock; psychedelic pop; psychedelic funk
- Occupations: Musician; singer; songwriter; producer; artist
- Years active: 1989-present

Shintaro Sakamoto (born September 9, 1967) is a Japanese musician, singer, songwriter, and producer. He was a founding member and the frontman for the underground Japanese psychedelic rock band Yura Yura Teikoku. After the band's breakup in 2010, Sakamoto began independently producing music, having released five solo albums to date.

== Career ==
Sakamoto formed Yura Yura Teikoku in 1989 with drummer Atsushi Yoshida and bassist Chiyo Kamekawa, two other students at Tama Art University. The band released 21 albums from 1989 to 2010, and produced music with indie labels until 1997, after which they moved on to Sony Music Entertainment and DFA Records. After reaching a high point in reputation and popularity in Japan, Yura Yura Teikoku disbanded on March 31, 2010.

Sakamoto began working on solo projects almost immediately after Yura Yura Teikoku's breakup, and released his first solo album, How to Live with a Phantom in 2011. How to Live with a Phantom was a significant departure from his former rock persona, described as "soft, groovy, mellow" funk and drew him comparisons to Todd Rundgren.

Sakamoto collaborated with drummer Yuta Suganuma and bassist AyA of Japanese psych-rock band OOIOO, handling much of the instrumental duties, to produce his second LP Let's Dance Raw, which released in 2014. The album blended Sakamoto's work in psychedelic rock and funk with a variety of global influences. Of his use of the steel guitar on the project, Sakamoto said "Without making it feel too Hawaiian, I wanted to incorporate the damp style of Japanese instruments. I wanted to feel the outskirts of a city". NPR Music described the steel guitar on "You Can Be a Robot, Too", one of the tracks on Let's Dance Raw, as "vibrant and infectious". The music videos for many tracks on Let's Dance Raw featured animated water colors painted by Sakamoto himself.

== Discography ==
=== Solo ===
- How to Live with a Phantom (2011)
- Let's Dance Raw (2014)
- Love If Possible (2016)
- Like a Fable (2022)
- Yoo-hoo (2026)
