= Kahimi Karie discography =

- Studio albums: 7
- EPs: 9
- Compilation albums: 5
- Singles: 9
- Video albums: 6
- Remix albums: 1

The discography of Japanese musician Kahimi Karie consists of seven studio albums, five compilation albums, one remix album, six video albums, nine extended plays and nine singles.

== Albums ==
=== Studio albums ===
List of studio albums, with selected chart positions
Title	Details	Peak chart positions
Title	Details	JPN
Larme de Crocodile	Released: March 25, 1997; Label: Crue-L; Formats: CD, LP	40
K.K.K.K.K.	Released: July 15, 1998; Label: Crue-L, Polydor; Formats: CD, LP	30
Tilt	Released: May 24, 2000; Label: Polydor; Formats: CD	46
Trapeziste	Released: February 21, 2003; Label: Victor; Formats: CD	—
Montage	Released: May 21, 2004; Label: Victor; Formats: CD	—
Nunki	Released: October 25, 2006; Label: Victor; Formats: CD	67
It's Here	Released: June 9, 2010; Label: Victor; Formats: CD, digital download	155
"—" denotes a recording that did not chart or was not released in that territory.

=== Compilation albums ===
List of compilation albums, with selected chart positions
Title	Details	Peak chart positions
Title	Details	JPN
Kahimi Karie	Released: September 8, 1998; Label: Minty Fresh; Formats: CD	—
The Best of Trattoria Years Plus More	Released: September 30, 1998; Label: Trattoria; Formats: CD	55
K.K. Limited Edition 2000	Released: May 24, 2000; Label: Polydor; Formats: CD and VHS box set	—
KK Works 1998–2000	Released: June 27, 2001; Label: Polydor; Formats: CD	—
Specialothers	Released: July 25, 2007; Label: Victor; Formats: CD	264
"—" denotes a recording that did not chart or was not released in that territory.

=== Remix albums ===
List of remix albums
Title	Details
A K Is a K Is a K	Released: December 23, 1998; Label: Crue-L, Polydor; Formats: CD, LP

=== Video albums ===
List of video albums, with selected chart positions
Title	Details	Peak chart positions
Title	Details	JPN DVD
Karie on TV	Released: December 24, 1994; Label: Crue-L; Formats: VHS	—
Karie on TV from Trattoria	Released: September 15, 1996; Label: Trattoria; Formats: VHS	—
K.K. Girly Action Tour in Tokyo	Released: May 24, 2000; Label: Universal; Formats: VHS	—
5songsondvd	Released: July 7, 2004; Label: Universal; Formats: DVD	133
Kochab	Released: October 4, 2006; Label: Victor; Formats: DVD	207
Muhlifein	Released: July 25, 2007; Label: Victor; Formats: DVD-V	296
"—" denotes a recording that did not chart or was not released in that territory.

== Extended plays ==
List of extended plays, with selected chart positions
Title	Details	Peak chart positions
Title	Details	JPN
My First Karie	Released: January 25, 1995; Label: Trattoria; Formats: CD	14
I Am a Kitten: Kahimi Karie Sings Momus in Paris	Released: January 25, 1995; Label: Crue-L; Formats: CD	—
Leur l'Existence	Released: July 26, 1995; Label: Trattoria; Formats: CD	9
Le Roi Soleil	Released: June 26, 1996; Label: Trattoria; Formats: CD	9
Remixes	Released: February 21, 1998; Label: Crue-L; Formats: CD, 12"	—
Once Upon a Time	Released: March 29, 2000; Label: Polydor; Formats: CD	—
Journey to the Centre of Me	Released: April 26, 2000; Label: Polydor; Formats: CD	—
My Suitor	Released: November 21, 2001; Label: Polydor; Formats: CD	—
Music for Nipper	Released: November 5, 2008; Label: His Master's Voice; Formats: CD, digital download	—
"—" denotes a recording that did not chart or was not released in that territory.

== Singles ==
List of singles, with selected chart positions, showing year released and album name
Title	Year	Peak chart positions	Album
Title	Year	JPN	Album
"Mike Alway's Diary" (with The Crue-L Grand Orchestra)	1992	—	Non-album singles
"Girly"	1994	—	Non-album singles
"Good Morning World"	1995	20	Non-album singles
"Humming ga Kikoeru"	1996	26	Non-album singles
"Tiny Monster" (Coba featuring Kahimi Karie)	1996	—	Sweet Poison
"Tiny King Kong"	1997	—	Larme de Crocodile
"One Thousand 20th Century Chairs"	1998	87	K.K.K.K.K.
"Take It Easy My Brother Charlie"	2002	—	Le Roi Soleil
"Nana"	2004	—	Montage
"—" denotes a recording that did not chart or was not released in that territory.

== Other appearances ==
List of other appearances, showing artist credit, year released and album name
Title	Year	Artist(s)	Album
"69/96 Girl Meets Cassette"	1995	Cornelius	69/96
"Good Morning World"	1996	Kahimi Karie	Sushi 3003
"Alcohol"	1998	Kahimi Karie	Sushi 4004
"Subete wo Yurashite (On a Chair)"	2001	Fantastic Plastic Machine	Contact
"Le Soleil d'or"	2003	Yuji Ohno featuring Kahimi Karie	Lupin Trois
"Cozmo-Naughty"	2005	M-Flo featuring Kahimi Karie	Beat Space Nine
"The Look of Love"	2005	Naruyoshi Kikuchi	Elizabeth Taylor en Amérique du Sud
"Crazy He Calls Me"	2005	Naruyoshi Kikuchi	Elizabeth Taylor en Amérique du Sud
"Eureka"	2005	Otomo Yoshihide's New Jazz Orchestra	ONJO
"Lost in the Rain"	2005	Otomo Yoshihide's New Jazz Orchestra	ONJO
"Mayonaka no Shizuka na Kuroi Kawa no Ue ni Ukabiagaru Shiroi Yuri no Hana"	2005	Otomo Yoshihide's New Jazz Orchestra	ONJO
"Blue Orb"	2005	Kahimi Karie	Katamari wa Damacy
"My Energy"	2006	Susumu Yokota	Wonder Waltz
"Don't Go to Sleep"	2006	Susumu Yokota	Wonder Waltz
"Eternity Is the Beginning of the End"	2006	Susumu Yokota	Wonder Waltz
"Fuuraibou"	2007	Jim O'Rourke and Kahimi Karie	Tribute to Haruomi Hosono
"Le Cheval blanc"	2008	Kahimi Karie	Detroit Metal City: Tribute to Krauser II – The Metal Mix
"Do You Know the Way to San Jose"	2010	Jim O'Rourke and Kahimi Karie	All Kinds of People: Love Burt Bacharach
"Je te dis au revoir"	2012	Kahimi Karie	Rhythm Thief & the Emperor's Treasure Original Soundtrack Vol. 2
"Piano Lesson"	2012	Fullkawa Honpo featuring Kahimi Karie	Alice in Wonderword
"Corcovado"	2013	Goro Ito featuring Kahimi Karie	Getz/Gilberto +50
"Cet enfant que je t'avais fait"	2016	Kahimi Karie and Albin de la Simone	Les 50 ans de Saravah
"Rainbow Connection"	2017	Otomo Yoshihide, Kahimi Karie, and Niki Karie	Esopus #24 CD: Pioneer Sessions
"You May Be Right"	2018	Struggle for Pride featuring Kahimi Karie, Daisuke Ohno, BBH	We Struggle for All Our Pride
