= KK Works 1998–2000 =

K.K. Works 1998–2000

Compilation album by Kahimi Karie
- Released: June 27, 2001
- Genre: Shibuya-kei, indie pop, alternative rock
- Length: 67:06
- Label: Polydor
- Producer: Kahimi Karie

Kahimi Karie chronology
Tilt (2000)	''K.K. Works 1998–2000'' (2001)	My Suitor (2002)

K.K. Works 1998–2000 is a compilation of tracks by Kahimi Karie recorded in the title years. It was issued in 2001 by the Japanese major label Polydor.

The songs are from the full-length albums K.K.K.K.K. and Tilt and the EPs Journey To The Centre To Me and Once Upon A Time (collaborations with Momus and The Olivia Tremor Control, respectively). The version of Momus' "Pygmalism" found on the K.K. Works album is taken from a remix CD issued with the rare multi-media collector's item K.K. Limited Edition 2000.

== Track listing ==
1. "Tilt" (remixed by The Sunshine Fix) – 2:35
2. "What Are You Wearing?" (Momus) – 5:35
3. "What Are You Wearing?" (remixed by Shinco) – 4:26
4. "Sleepwalking" (Arto Lindsay/Gibbs) – 3:08
5. "Pygmalism" (Momus; remixed by Optiganally Yours) – 6:46
6. "Turtle Song" (Olivia Tremor Control/Thebilldoss) – 3:21
7. "Clip-Clap" (Stereo Total) – 2:49
8. "Mistaken Memories Of Medieval Manhattan" (Momus) – 4:31
9. "Harmony Korine" (Momus) – 4:46
10. "Dear Boy" (Arto Lindsay/Cantuaria) – 5:49
11. "Do You Know The Time?" (Olivia Tremor Control/Hart) – 3:06
12. "Metaphors" (Olivia Tremor Control/Hart) – 2:43
13. "The Symphonies Of Beethoven" (Momus) – 4:46
14. "Orly-Narita" (Philippe Katerine; remixed by Buffalo Daughter) –5:52
15. "I Can't Wait For Summer" (Tomoki Kanda/Kahimi Karie) – 4:14
16. "Lost In A Paris Nightclub" (Olivia Tremor Control/Thebilldoss) – 2:39
