= Voyager (Momus album) =

Album by Momus

Studio album by Momus
- Released: 1992
- Length: 42:00
- Label: Creation Records (CRE 113)

Momus chronology
The Ultraconformist (1992)	Voyager (1992)	Timelord (1993)

Voyager is the seventh album by Scottish musician Momus, released in 1992 by Creation Records. Voyager marked Momus' increased popularity in Japan, where he was signed to Nippon Columbia and began to collaborate with a number of notable Shibuya-kei artists.

== Background ==
Voyager marked a turn in Momus's musical and lyrical output, which became increasingly focused on Japanese themes and musically influenced by ambient and house music. Inspired in part by the staging of a Yukio Mishima play that Momus had attended at the 1991 Edinburgh Festival, the album heavily utilized science fiction themes. Momus described this era as "looking into 21st century", and reflective of a "new sensibility in the 90s".

The first single released for the album was "Summer Holiday 1999", which initially appeared on a 1990 Polystar Records compilation titled Fab Gear. The song was inspired by Summer Vacation 1999, a Japanese film set in the near-future about the homoerotic relationships of Japanese schoolboys, featuring an all-female cast.

Though Momus would later spend much of his life living in Japan, he first visited the country in 1990 at the request of the Shibuya-kei band Flipper's Guitar, who had coordinated the release of the Fab Gear compilation. Though he had not seen success equal to his 1989 single "The Hairstyle of the Devil" continue in the UK, he began to gain popularity in East Asia. Momus would soon collaborate with a number of Japanese artists, including Poison Girlfriend (whose name is a direct reference to Momus's 1987 album, The Poison Boyfriend) and Kahimi Karie.

Voyager was reissued in 2018 on Cherry Red Records in a box set of Momus's Creation Records albums. It is included on the second volume, Recreate, with bonus tracks.

== Reception ==
Professional ratings
Review scores
Source	Rating
Allmusic	4/5 stars
NME	2/10

The album received mixed reviews from the UK press. NME writer Barbara Ellen rated the album 2/10, comparing the album to Pet Shop Boys and Gary Numan, but saying the album was "misguided", adding that, "Voyager could satisfy only those who live to banquet on Neil Tennant's discarded nail clippings." Melody Maker's Simon Price gave the album a glowing review, noting a "revolutionary" change in Momus's style, and adding that the album was "awash with luxuriant synths and awe-inspiring vistas". AllMusic's Charles Spano rated the album 4/5 stars, calling it one of Momus's "most sentimental albums" and praising its "bittersweet dreaminess".

== Track listing ==
All tracks are written by Momus

No.	Title	Length
1.	"Cibachrome Blue"	4:40
2.	"Virtual Reality"	3:18
3.	"Vocation"	3:30
4.	"Conquistador"	5:31
5.	"Spacewalk"	3:53
6.	"Summer Holiday 1999"	3:18
7.	"Trans Siberian Express"	5:15
8.	"Afterglow"	4:09
9.	"Voyager"	5:49
10.	"Momutation 3"	2:29
Total length:		42:00

Create 2 — Recreate bonus tracks
No.	Title	Length
11.	"Summer Holiday 1999 (Original version)"	3:15
12.	"I'm Still Trying"	2:48
13.	"Things You Never Did"	3:25
Total length:		51:08

== Personnel ==
- All songs written, produced, and recorded by Momus
- Engineered by Doug Martin
- Translation by Chiharu Watabe
- Cover photography by Thomi Wroblewski
- Design by Claudia Casagrande and Rafael Jiménez
