= Ocky Milk =

Studio album by Momus
- Released: 10 March 2006
- Length: 54:01
- Label: Analog Baroque (ANALOG 012CD) American Patchwork (AMPATCH0007)
- Producer: John Talaga

Momus chronology
Otto Spooky (2005)	Ocky Milk (2006)	Joemus (2008)

Ocky Milk is the 19th studio album by Scottish musician Momus. It was released on 10 March 2006 through Momus' own label, Analog Baroque (a division of Cherry Red Records), and re-issued through independent label American Patchwork. It is currently distributed on CD by Darla Records.

== Background ==
Ocky Milk was recorded between 2005 and Summer 2006. Originally set to be called "The Friendly Album", the album was first announced on Momus' long-running blog, Click Opera, in March 2005. Momus, who had spent much of the 2000s living in and visiting Japan, recruited American producer Rusty Santos to record the initial demos in Berlin, adding further samples from Enka music during a stay in Osaka. After relocating to New York City to work at the Whitney Biennial, Momus completed the album with producer John Talaga, who had previously produced Otto Spooky and Oskar Tennis Champion.

Momus variously described the album as "communistic" and "feminine", stating that he wanted to "make something as static, as friendly, as consensual, as self-effacing, as Japan itself". The album's final title references Ocky Milkman, a character in Welsh writer Dylan Thomas' 1954 radio play Under Milk Wood.

Professional ratings
Review scores
Source	Rating
Pitchfork	6/10
Stylus Magazine	B+

== Reception ==
Ocky Milk received mixed to positive reviews from critics. Pitchfork contributor Matt LeMay called Ocky Milk "wordy and culturally adroit", praising Momus' "new embrace of restraint and minimalism". LeMay gave the album a mixed review, saying that it "[ranged] from solid to thoroughly unspectacular", and rated the album 6.0/10. American music webzine Stylus rated the album a B+, praising the album's experimental quality and calling it a "fuller, warmer" release than previous Momus albums. Critics generally saw the album as a departure from Momus' 1990s work, noting a focus on digital instrumentation over his often-literary and clever lyrics.

== Track listing ==
All tracks are written by Momus.

No.	Title	Length
1.	"Moop Bears"	4:21
2.	"Frilly Military"	2:44
3.	"The Birdcatcher"	3:50
4.	"Nervous Heartbeat"	3:18
5.	"Dialtone"	2:56
6.	"Hang Low"	4:35
7.	"Permagasm"	3:23
8.	"Pleasantness"	2:16
9.	"Devil Mask, Buddha Mind"	2:25
10.	"7000 BC"	4:47
11.	"Zanzibar"	5:04
12.	"Count Ossie in China"	3:46
13.	"Dr Cat"	2:43
14.	"I Refuse To Die"	3:32
15.	"Ex-Erotomane"	4:21
Total length:		54:01

== Personnel ==
- All songs written by Momus
- Produced by John Talaga
- Recorded by Rusty Santos
- Artwork by Julie Jim
- Cover photography by James Goggin
