= My Suitor (EP) =

EP by Kahimi Karie
- Released: January 15, 2002
- Genre: Shibuya-kei, experimental
- Label: Polydor
- Producer: Kahimi Karie

Kahimi Karie chronology
Tilt (2000)	''My Suitor'' (2002)	Trapeziste (2003)

Professional ratings
Review scores
Source	Rating
AllMusic	(3/5)

My Suitor is an 8-track EP or mini-album of covers from Japanese pop star Kahimi Karie. The original songs were largely recorded by little-known UK artists in the 1980s including Dolly Mixture and the Lilac Time. It was released in Japan in 2002 by the Polydor label. The disc was packaged with a bonus track, "Warrior in Wordsworth" and the music video for "Melt the Snow".

== Track listing ==
(Track 8 is a "hidden" or bonus track on the original pressing only)

1. "My Suitor" (Bernthøler) –
2. "Dilly Dally Dolly" (Dolly Mixture) –
3. "Melt the Snow" (Virginia Astley)–
4. "Drumbeat for Baby" (Weekend) –
5. "Black Velvet" (The Lilac Time) –
6. "Since You've Been Away" (The French Impressionists) –
7. "The Photo Song" (Holger Czukay) –
8. "Warrior in Wordsworth" (X-Ray Spex) –
