= Kahimi Karie (album) =

Compilation album by Kahimi Karie
- Released: September 8, 1998
- Genre: Shibuya-kei
- Length: 39:21
- Label: Minty Fresh
- Producer: Kahimi Karie; Momus; Keigo Oyamada; Philippe Katerine; Tomoki Kanda

Kahimi Karie chronology
K.K.K.K.K. (1998)	Kahimi Karie (1998)	Tilt (2000)

Professional ratings
Review scores
Source	Rating
AllMusic	4/5 stars
Pitchfork	5.7/10

Kahimi Karie is a compilation album by Japanese musician Kahimi Karie. It was released on September 8, 1998 by Minty Fresh in the United States, serving as her debut album in the country. Kahimi Karie primarily consists of tracks from Karie's previous EPs and singles, excepting one track taken from her 1997 debut album Larme de Crocodile. It utilizes the cover art from Karie's 1995 EP My First Karie.

In Japan, The Best of Trattoria Years Plus More, an equivalent compilation featuring an identical track listing to Kahimi Karie, was released on September 30, 1998 by Trattoria Records.

== Track listing ==
Songwriting credits are adapted from the liner notes of The Best of Trattoria Years Plus More.

No.	Title	Lyrics	Music	Original release	Length
1.	"Good Morning World"	Momus	Momus	"Good Morning World" single	3:31
2.	"Candyman"	Kahimi Karie	Keigo Oyamada	"Girly" single	4:27
3.	"Elastic Girl"	Karie	Oyamada; Bryan Burton-Lewis	My First Karie	5:48
4.	"Mike Alway's Diary"	Karie	Oyamada	"Mike Alway's Diary" single	3:18
5.	"Le Roi Soleil"	Momus	Oyamada	Le Roi Soleil	5:16
6.	"Take It Easy My Brother Charlie"	Astrud Gilberto; David Jordan; Jorge Ben (Note: Credited solely to Gilberto and Jordan in liner notes, reflecting the original songwriting credits for Gilberto's 1972 recording)	Gilberto; Jordan; Ben	Le Roi Soleil	3:40
7.	"Zoom Up!"	Karie	Oyamada	My First Karie	2:03
8.	"Serieux comme le plaisir"		Michel Berger (Note: Erroneously credited to Serge Gainsbourg in liner notes)	Leur l'Existence	2:19
9.	"Lolitapop Dollhouse"	Momus	Momus	Larme de Crocodile	4:08
10.	"Dis-moi quelque chose avant de dormir"	Philippe Katerine	Katerine	My First Karie	2:07
11.	"When You Close Your Eyes"	Karie	Tomoki Kanda	My First Karie	2:44
Total length:					39:21

== Charts ==
=== The Best of Trattoria Years Plus More ===
Chart (1998)	Peak position
Japanese Albums (Oricon)	55
