= Hypnoprism =

Album by Momus

Studio album by Momus
- Released: 27 September 2010
- Length: 47:00
- Label: Analog Baroque (ANALOG014) American Patchwork (AMPATCH009)

Momus chronology
Joemus (2008)	Hypnoprism (2010)	Thunderclown with John Henriksson (2012)

Hypnoprism is an album by Scottish musician Momus. It was released on 27 September 2010 through independent label Analog Baroque (a division of Cherry Red Records) in the United Kingdom, and in the United States by American Patchwork, distributed on CD by Darla Records.

== Background ==
Momus says the album was inspired by "falling back in love with pop music" through YouTube videos. Hypnoprism was, in turn, the first Momus album released through YouTube, with self-made music videos uploaded as songs were finished, a process that he would continue into the 2020s.

The album sleeve was painted by Japanese artist Misako Kawai. Track 12, "Adoration", is a cover of the song by Josef K, the Scottish post-punk band containing members of Momus' former band, the Happy Family.

The album's title track was later reworked for Momus' 2018 album Pantaloon as "Brexochasm".

== Reception ==
Professional ratings
Review scores
Source	Rating
PopMatters	8/10 stars

Hypnoprism received mixed to positive reviews from critics. Exclaim! critic Michael Edwards praised the artist's "newfound playfulness" and commented that some tracks harkened back to his Creation Records output of the 1990s. However, Edwards commented that the mix of genres present on the album, though ambitious, could "clash awkwardly" and were "somewhat fragmented". Mojo praised the album's lyrical content and noted hints of bossa nova, and Uncut called it "21st century lounge music". PopMatters writer Stephen Rowland gave the album a glowing review, rating it 8/10. Rowland called the album "utterly unique", adding that it contained "many moments of brilliance". Blurt Magazine highlighted "Datapanik" and "Adoration" as two of the album's standout tracks. Other tracks drew comparison to the work of Soft Cell, of Montreal, Talk Talk, Roxy Music, and the Divine Comedy.

== Track listing ==
All tracks are written by Momus, except where indicated

No.	Title	Writer(s)	Length
1.	"Hypnoprism"		3:48
2.	"The Charm Song"	Jacob Gade	2:43
3.	"Datapanik"		4:33
4.	"Evil Genius"		3:40
5.	"Mr. Consistency"		4:40
6.	"Deliverance"		3:51
7.	"Is There Sex In Marriage?"		1:51
8.	"Death Ruins Everything"		3:13
9.	"Bubble Music"		4:09
10.	"The Building Song"		2:59
11.	"Confiance Absolue"	Kumi Okamoto	3:19
12.	"Adoration"	Paul Haig	3:32
13.	"Strawberry Hill"		4:42
Total length:			47:00

== Personnel ==
- All songs recorded and produced by Nick Currie
- Tracks 3, 7 arranged by John Talaga
- Track 13 featuring Joe Howe
- Artwork by Misako Kawai
- Design by James Goggin of Practise
