= Time Lord (disambiguation) =

A Time Lord is a member of a fictional extraterrestrial species in the BBC TV series Doctor Who

Time Lord may also refer to:

== Gaming ==
- Time Lord (role-playing game), a roleplaying game by Virgin Publishing based on Doctor Who
- TimeLords (role-playing game), a roleplaying game by Blacksburg Tactical Research Center, unrelated to Doctor Who
- Time Lord (video game), a video game for the Nintendo Entertainment System
- Time lords, a series of cards in the Yu-Gi-Oh! Trading Card Game
- The Time Lord, a fictional character from the Ultima series of computer games

== Other uses ==
- Time Lords, a class of fictional characters featured in the 2003 TV series Teenage Mutant Ninja Turtles
- The Time Lord, a one-off villain from The Super Globetrotters animated cartoon
- The Timelords, the name under which the musical group The KLF released "Doctorin' the Tardis"
- Timelord (album), an album by Momus
- Robert Williams III, American basketball player nicknamed "Time Lord"
- Time Lord: Sir Sandford Fleming and the Creation of Standard Time, a 2000 book by Clark Blaise about Sandford Fleming's creation of the time zone system

== See also ==
- The Lord of Time, a fictional opponent of the Justice League of America, also known as Epoch
