= Glyptotek =

Glyptotek or Glyptothek may refer to:

- Ny Carlsberg Glyptotek, an art museum in Copenhagen, Denmark
- Glyptothek, an art museum in Munich, Germany
- Glyptothek (album), an album by Scottish musician Momus
