= Ping Pong (Momus album) =

Studio album by Momus
- Released: 1997
- Length: 71:52
- Label: Le Grand Magistery
- Producer: Momus

Momus chronology
20 Vodka Jellies (1996)	Ping Pong (1997)	The Little Red Songbook (1998)

Professional ratings
Review scores
Source	Rating
AllMusic	3/5 stars
Entertainment Weekly	B+
NME	2/10
Pitchfork	9.1/10
Q	3/5 stars
Rolling Stone	3.5/5 stars
The Rolling Stone Album Guide	3.5/5 stars
The Village Voice	B−

Ping Pong is the eleventh studio album by Scottish musician Momus, released in 1997. It has been described as the beginning of his "analog baroque" style.

The album's tenth track, "Lolitapop Dollhouse", was recorded by Japanese musician Kahimi Karie and released on her 1997 album Larme de Crocodile, which featured four other Momus-penned tracks.

== Track listing ==
All tracks are written by Momus.

No.	Title	Length
1.	"Ping Pong with Hong Kong King Kong (A Sing Song)"	0:49
2.	"His Majesty the Baby"	4:22
3.	"My Pervert Doppelganger"	4:32
4.	"I Want You, but I Don't Need You"	4:46
5.	"Professor Shaftenberg"	3:33
6.	"Shoesize of the Angel"	6:33
7.	"The Age of Information"	4:37
8.	"The Sensation of Orgasm"	3:52
9.	"Anthem of Shibuya"	4:00
10.	"Lolitapop Dollhouse"	4:08
11.	"Tamagotchi Press Officer"	2:20
12.	"Space Jews"	3:58
13.	"My Kindly Friend the Censor"	3:53
14.	"The Animal That Desires"	7:05
15.	"How to Get – and Stay – Famous"	7:36
16.	"2PM"	5:56
