= Fever Dream (disambiguation) =

A fever dream is a type of dream that occurs during illness, particularly a fever.

Fever Dream(s) may also refer to:

== Film and television ==
- Fever Dream, a 1979 film by Chick Strand
- Fever Dream (film), an adaptation of Samanta Schweblin's novel (see below)
- Fever Dreams (company), a film-development division of the American company Media Blasters
- "Fever Dream" (The Spanish Princess), a 2019 television episode

== Literature ==
- Fever Dream (Preston and Child novel), a 2010 novel by Douglas Preston and Lincoln Child
- Fever Dream (Schweblin novel), a 2014 novel by Samanta Schweblin
- "Fever Dream" (short story), a 1948 short story by Ray Bradbury
- Fever/Dream, a 2009 play by Sheila Callaghan

== Music ==
=== Albums ===
- Fever Dream (Alias album), 2011
- Fever Dream (Ben Watt album) or the title song, 2016
- Fever Dream (Of Monsters and Men album), 2019
- Fever Dream, by Cannons, 2022
- Fever Dream, by Cover Your Tracks, 2016
- Fever Dream, by Mamaleek, 2008
- Fever Dream, by Palaye Royale, or the title song, 2022
- Fever Dream, by Richie Kotzen, 1990
- A Fever Dream, by Everything Everything, or the title song, 2017
- Fever Dreams Pts 1–4, by Johnny Marr, 2022
- Fever Dreams (Steve Roach album), 2004
- Fever Dreams, by Mia Borders, 2016
- Fever Dreams, by Val Astaire, 2020
- Fever Dreams, by Villagers, 2021

=== EPs ===
- Fever Dream, by Young Summer, 2013
- Fever Dream Part I and Fever Dream Part II, by Must Die!, 2013
- Fever Dreams, by Jamie N Commons, 2019

=== Songs ===
- "Fever Dream" (song), by Alex Warren, 2026
- "Fever Dream", by the Amity Affliction from Everyone Loves You... Once You Leave Them, 2020
- "Fever Dream", by Biffy Clyro from Balance, Not Symmetry, 2019
- "Fever Dream", by Bury Your Dead from Bury Your Dead, 2008
- "Fever Dream", by Frank Iero from Barriers, 2019
- "Fever Dream", by Heavy Heart from Keepsake, 2016
- "Fever Dream", by Iron & Wine from Our Endless Numbered Days, 2004
- "Fever Dream", by Loggins and Messina from Mother Lode, 1974
- "Fever Dream", by Momus from Vivid, 2020
- "Fever Dream", by More Than Skies from the soundtrack of the film The Space Between, 2017
- "Fever Dream", by Movements from Feel Something, 2017
- "Fever Dream", by mxmtoon from Dawn, 2020
- "Fever Dream", by Sarah Klang, 2021
- "Fever Dream", by Steve Vai from The Ultra Zone, 1999
- "Fever Dream", by Tangerine, 2017
- "Fever Dreams", by Circa Survive from Blue Sky Noise, 2010
- "Fever Dreams", by Dashboard Confessional from The Shade of Poison Trees, 2007
- "Fever Dreams", by Dio from Magica, 2000
- "Fever Dreams", by Hardline from Danger Zone, 2018

== Other uses ==
- Fever Dreams, a podcast co-hosted by Will Sommer

== See also ==
- Fevre Dream, a 1982 novel by George R. R. Martin
- Dream
- Nightmare
- False awakening
- Fever
