= Folktronic (album) =

Studio album by Momus
- Released: 2001
- Recorded: 2000
- Studio: Fakeways Institute, New York City
- Genre: Synth pop, indietronica
- Length: 67:10
- Label: Le Grand Magistery
- Producer: Momus

Momus chronology
Stars Forever (1999)	Folktronic (2001)	Oskar Tennis Champion (2003)

Professional ratings
Aggregate scores
Source	Rating
Metacritic	57/100
Review scores
Source	Rating
AllMusic	3/5 stars
Pitchfork	6.4 stars on a 10 point scale

Folktronic is a 2001 album by Momus. It is a concept album, an, "anthology of fake folk."

== Track listing ==
1. "Appalachia"
2. "Smooth Folk Singer"
3. "Mountain Music"
4. "Simple Men"
5. "Finnegan the Folk Hero"
6. "Protestant Art"
7. "U.S. Knitting"
8. "Jarre in Hicksville"
9. "Tape Recorder Man"
10. "Little Apples"
11. "Robocowboys"
12. "Psychopathia Sexualis"
13. "Folk Me Amadeus"
14. "Handheld"

=== Bonus tracks ===
1. "The Penis Song"
2. "Heliogabalus"
3. "Going for a Walk with a Line"
4. "The Lady of Shalott"
5. "Mistaken Memories of Medieval Manhattan"
6. "Pygmalism"
