= Otto Spooky =

Studio album by Momus
- Released: 28 February 2005
- Genre: Pop/rock
- Length: 69:59
- Label: Analog Baroque
- Producer: John Talaga

Momus chronology
Summerisle (2004)	Otto Spooky (2005)	Ocky Milk (2006)

Professional ratings
Aggregate scores
Source	Rating
Metacritic	65/100
Review scores
Source	Rating
PopMatters	5/10 stars

Otto Spooky is the 18th studio album by the avant-garde artist Momus, released in 2005. He describes its style as "chanson concrete": a blend of his love of songwriters such as Jacques Brel and Serge Gainsbourg with his love of musique concrète that has been motivating his radical use of studio techniques to alter sound for years. It has been described as, "a few steps further from the mainstream than Oskar Tennis Champion."

== Track listing ==
1. "Sempreverde" - 3:53
2. "Life of the Fields" - 5:49
3. "Corkscrew King" - 5:26
4. "Klaxon" - 3:52
5. "Robin Hood" - 4:17
6. "Lady Fancy Knickers" - 4:58
7. "Lute Score" - 2:54
8. "Belvedere" - 3:48
9. "Your Fat Friend" - 4:02
10. "Mr Ulysses" - 5:16
11. "Water Song" - 4:07
12. "Jesus In Furs" - 4:32
13. "Bantam Boys" - 4:00
14. "Cockle Pickers" - 7:56
15. "The Artist Overwhelmed" - 4:25
