= The Philosophy of Momus =

Album by Momus

Studio album by Momus
- Released: 1 April 1995
- Genre: Shibuya-kei
- Length: 1:09:45
- Label: Cherry Red Records (CD BRED 119) Nippon Columbia (COCY-78417)

Momus chronology
Timelord (1993)	The Philosophy of Momus (1995)	20 Vodka Jellies (1996)

The Philosophy of Momus is the ninth studio album by Scottish musician Momus. It was released on 1 April 1995 through Nippon Columbia in Japan, and Cherry Red Records in the United Kingdom.

== Background ==
The Philosophy of Momus was the first Momus album released after his departure from Creation Records, and his second album released on Nippon Columbia, his first major label. It also was one of his first albums released after he had gained a cult following in the United States, and mainstream status in Japan. Though Momus claimed in a 1995 interview with Kill Pearl Jam Dead that much of the album's lyrical content was similar to previous releases, he had increasingly become interested in Japanese subjects, reflective of his collaborations with artists like Kahimi Karie and his newfound popularity in Japan.

The album was released the year following Momus's marriage to Shazna Nessa, a Bangladesh-born teenager, and their relocation to Paris. It was recorded in London and Paris.

The album frequently references figures in art and pop culture, including Jamaican record producer Lee "Scratch" Perry and Japanese eroticist Kuniyoshi Kaneko.

Track 19, "The Sadness of Things", was written by Momus with Ken Morioka, a member of Japanese electronic group Soft Ballet and frequent collaborator in the visual kei scene.

== Reception ==
Professional ratings
Review scores
Source	Rating
AllMusic	3/5 stars
NME	7/10
Q	2/5 stars

The Philosophy of Momus received mixed reviews from the British press. Melody Maker's Mark Luffman panned the album as "a jamboree bag of aphorisms", stating its "featherweight sheen" of music was overpowered by the "cod-philosophising" of Momus's lyrics. NME's John Robinson gave the album a more positive review, rating the album seven out of ten. Robinson called The Philosophy of Momus "intense and witty" and compared Momus to a "Leonard Cohen for the '90s". British newspaper The Independent also gave a positive review, calling it "witty and always perfectly measured" and comparing the album's sound to that of Pet Shop Boys. AllMusic's Steve Huey rated the album three stars out of five, praising the album's production.

== Track listing ==
All tracks are written by Momus, except track 19, music by Ken Morioka.

No.	Title	Length
1.	"Toothbrushead"	1:35
2.	"The Madness of Lee Scratch Perry"	5:38
3.	"It's Important to Be Trendy"	4:13
4.	"Quark & Charm, the Robot Twins"	4:08
5.	"Girlish Boy"	3:42
6.	"Yokohama Chinatown"	2:54
7.	"Withinity"	3:58
8.	"K's Diary"	2:42
9.	"Virtual Valerie"	4:03
10.	"Red Pyjamas"	2:44
11.	"The Cabinet of Kuniyoshi Kaneko"	4:09
12.	"Slide Projector Lie Detector"	3:48
13.	"Microworlds"	4:12
14.	"Complicated"	3:07
15.	"I Had a Girl"	2:48
16.	"The Philosophy of Momus"	3:35
17.	"The Loneliness of Lift Music"	4:07
18.	"Paranoid Acoustic Seduction Machine"	3:07
19.	"The Sadness of Things"	5:30
Total length:		1:09:45

== Personnel ==
- Tracks 1–18 written by Nick Currie
- Music on Track 19 written by Ken Morioka
- Recorded by Nick Currie
- Mastered by Denis Blackham
- Artwork by Nick Currie
- Liner notes by Kahimi Karie
