= Timelord (album) =

Album by Momus

Studio album by Momus
- Released: October 1993
- Genre: Synthpop
- Length: 36:12
- Labels: Creation Records (CRE 151); Nippon Columbia (COCY-75676)
- Producer: Momus

Momus chronology
Voyager (1992)	Timelord (1993)	The Philosophy of Momus (1995)

Timelord is the eighth studio album by Scottish musician Momus. It was released in October 1993 through Creation Records in Europe and Nippon Columbia in Japan.

== Background ==
Timelord has been described by Momus as "the album that shot itself in the foot". Momus's then-girlfriend, Shazna Nessa, a Bangladesh-born 17-year-old, had been forced into an arranged marriage and kept apart from him. The album was recorded as a response, in a period during which it appeared that their relationship would end permanently, and as a result contains some of the artist's most personal and vulnerable material. Much of the album focuses on themes of love and heartbreak, but also of illness and death, reflective of the AIDS epidemic sweeping Europe at the time. Momus and Nessa were married the following year after assistance from the British High Commission.

Timelord was the first Momus album to be released on a major label, namely Nippon Columbia, who oversaw the album's release in Japan; it was also Momus's final album on Creation Records. Momus was let go from the label after Nessa's brothers stormed the Creation offices wielding machetes in search of the singer. He would go on to sign with Cherry Red Records.

The album's sleeve is a portrait of Momus clad in knight's armour, photographed by notable French artists Pierre et Gilles.

Timelord was reissued in 2018 as part of the Create 2 - Recreate compilation, alongside Hippopotamomus and Voyager. This reissue included three bonus tracks and liner notes by Anthony Reynolds.

== Reception ==
Professional ratings
Review scores
Source	Rating
AllMusic	2/5 stars
NME	7/10 stars
Vox	6/10 stars

Timelord received mixed to positive reviews from the British press. NME rated the album 7/10, with critic Stephen Dalton praising Momus' "dry wit, effortless diversity, and enduring fondness for pop" but noting that the album felt "emaciated", adding that the album focused heavily on darker themes of aging, death, and illness. Select also noted the album's darker themes, stating that it was a welcome change from Momus's more humorous writing. Vox critic Steve Malins rated the album 6/10, calling it variously "soothing" and "chilling". Melody Maker commented that, although the album focused on more negative themes than his usual work, Momus offers a glimpse of hope in the album's closing track, "Breathless". AllMusic critic Steve Huey panned the album as inconsistent, but noted that it "can't be divorced from [the] context" of Momus's tumultuous personal life.

Upon the album's reissue in 2018, it garnered further favourable reviews. Louder Than War critic Craig Chaligne commented that the album had "a certain timelessness", and that "Momus’ soulful delivery masks a rather bleak set of lyrics".

== Track listing ==
All tracks are written by Momus.

No.	Title	Length
1.	"Platinum"	4:43
2.	"Enlightenment"	4:30
3.	"You've Changed"	3:43
4.	"Landrover"	5:06
5.	"Rhetoric"	5:09
6.	"Suicide Pact"	3:35
7.	"Christmas on Earth"	5:07
8.	"Breathless"	4:16
Total length:		36:12

Create 2 — Recreate bonus tracks
No.	Title	Length
9.	"Je Suis Avec Le Christ"	4:28
10.	"Song of the Traffic Crossing"	3:24
11.	"Empress of Hawaii"	4:46
Total length:		48:50

== Personnel ==
- All songs written by Nick Currie
- All songs produced, programmed, recorded, and engineered by Momus
- Design by Anthony Sweeney
- Cover photography by Pierre et Gilles
