= Tender Pervert =

Studio album by Momus
- Released: 1988
- Genre: Synthpop
- Length: 47:57
- Label: Creation
- Producer: Momus

Momus chronology
The Poison Boyfriend (1987)	Tender Pervert (1988)	Don't Stop the Night (1989)

Singles from Tender Pervert
- 1. "Right Hand Heart" Released: 1988

Tender Pervert is the third studio album by Scottish musician Momus, released in 1988 on Creation Records.

== Background ==
The album's working title was The Homosexual, due to its homosexual themes (as seen in "The Homosexual", "Love on Ice", and "Bishonen"). Momus was dissuaded by Creation Records founder Alan McGee from naming it as such due to the presumption that Canadian distributor PolyGram would not release an album under that title. The album's frequent references to homosexuality were based on Momus' reaction to homophobic rhetoric in the British media surrounding the AIDS epidemic, suggesting that, "...if gay people are not only dying but being gagged by the government while dying, it's up to straight people to promote homosexuality in their place". The album was also influenced by the themes explored by Serge Gainsbourg in his 1984 album, Love on the Beat, as well as Japanese pop culture and cultural figures such as Yukio Mishima.

== Critical reception ==
Professional ratings
Review scores
Source	Rating
AllMusic	4.5/5 stars
NME	9/10

Reviews of the album tended to be positive. Steve Huey of AllMusic called Tender Pervert "the first great Momus album" in a retrospective review, noting that it was the first Momus album to incorporate his trademark use of irony in addition to the synth-pop that would serve as the basis for later albums. Len Brown of Britain's NME noted the album's "intelligent, cutting lyrics". Andy Hurt of Sounds praised Tender Pervert for its "uncomfortable strength and purity", praising Momus for his use of metaphor and autobiography on the album. Christopher Dawes of Melody Maker called Momus's work on Tender Pervert "bold", saying that its "warrior poetry rarely complicated with harmony".

== Legacy ==
The artwork for Primal Scream's tenth album More Light, designed by Scottish artist Jim Lambie, references the cover design of Tender Pervert by Thomi Wroblewski, which depicts Momus in front of a floral background, raising his index fingers above his head as if to mimic horns. "I Was A Maoist Intellectual" is quoted in Patrik Sampler's novel The Ocean Container.

"The Homosexual" was covered by Kirin J. Callinan on his 2019 album, Return to Center.

== Track listing ==
All tracks are written by Nicholas Currie (Momus)

No.	Title	Length
1.	"The Angels Are Voyeurs"	2:45
2.	"Love on Ice"	3:54
3.	"I Was a Maoist Intellectual"	4:34
4.	"The Homosexual"	4:44
5.	"Bishonen"	7:40
6.	"A Complete History of Sexual Jealousy (Parts 17 – 24)"	5:39
7.	"Ice King"	4:55
8.	"In the Sanatorium"	5:07
9.	"The Charm of Innocence"	6:35
10.	"The Angels Are Voyeurs (Reprise)"	0:56

== Personnel ==
Credits adapted from liner notes.

- Momus – performance, writing, production
- The Brothers Quay – "imaginary videos"
- Ian Buruma – "heroes and villains of Japanese culture"
- Mika Goto – "roses and bishōnen comics"
- Dave Harper – cover features
- Mike Hinc – "travel"
- Nicki Kefalis – radio
- Dean Klevatt – sequential programming and performance
- Vici MacDonald – "thunder player"
- Alan McGee – "worldplans"
- Nigel Palmer – "exquisite engineering"
- Ruth Stirling – interpreter
- Thomi Wroblewski – photography
