= Bibliotek =

Studio album by Momus
- Released: 5 June 2012
- Length: 43:08
- Label: American Patchwork (AMPATCH011)

Momus chronology
Hypnoprism (2010)	Bibliotek (2012)	Bambi (2013)

Bibliotek is a 2012 album by Scottish musician Momus. It was released on 5 June 2012 by independent record label American Patchwork on CD and distributed by Darla Records.

== Background ==
"The appropriate psychogeography is easily conjured by a YouTube video that purloins material from "the haunted archive". Archival representations of countryside [...] are much more evocative than real countryside. There's a haunted forest of the mind, and it's really the haunted archive itself, disguised as a forest."

— Momus on Bibliotek.

The book Žižek's Jokes: (Did You Hear the One about Hegel and Negation?), a 2014 compilation of Slavoj Žižek jokes, described Bibliotek as "pastoral horror." Momus said its genre's most immediate source is British horror films of the early 1970s while tracing literary influences back to such writers as William Blake, Horace, John Milton, and Samuel Palmer. He recorded the album in Osaka, Japan while writing a script for a horror film set in the BBC Radiophonic Workshop. Bibliotek samples the films The Blood on Satan's Claw (1971), The Wicker Man (1973), and Woman in the Dunes (1964) as well as their respective soundtracks, e.g. Toru Takemitsu's film score, etc. Songs from Bibliotek and from other 2000s albums Bambi, Glyptothek, and Turpsycore were recollected in the Cherry Red Records anthology Pubic Intellectual.

== Reception ==
Professional ratings
Review scores
Source	Rating
PopMatters	8/10 stars

Tank's Shumon Basar described it as "haunted by the necromancy of "pastoral horror" and his dread of the countryside." The Eclectic Collective said "[Bibliotek's] suggestions range from soft horror movies to unhealthy b-movies atmospheres, with morbid pastoral landscapes." PopMatters's Brice Ezell reviewed the album favorably stating "Bibliotek, his twenty-somethingth release, is as obtuse as anything he's put out before." Reviewing the Cherry Red Records anthology Pubic Intellectual, Ezell described the music as "forlorn lyrics and minor-key melancholy [...] are compelling even in Momus' low-key style." PlayGround's Cristian Rodríguez called it "eerily beautiful."

== Track listing ==
No.	Title	Length
1.	"Erase"	2:22
2.	"Lycidas"	2:33
3.	"Dunes"	3:08
4.	"Farther"	4:40
5.	"Core"	2:47
6.	"Southbound"	3:42
7.	"Huge"	3:03
8.	"Bibliotek"	3:06
9.	"International"	3:29
10.	"Cheekbone"	2:46
11.	"Erostratus"	2:12
12.	"Jackdaw"	3:45
13.	"Shunned"	4:19
14.	"Isaak"	1:19
