= Turpsycore =

Studio album by Momus
- Released: 3 March 2015
- Length: 3:12:53
- Label: American Patchwork (AMPATCH016)

Momus chronology
Bambi (2013)	Turpsycore (2015)	Glyptothek (2015)

Turpsycore is a 2015 album by Scottish musician Momus. It was released on 3 March 2015 by independent record label American Patchwork on CD and distributed by Darla Records.

== Background ==
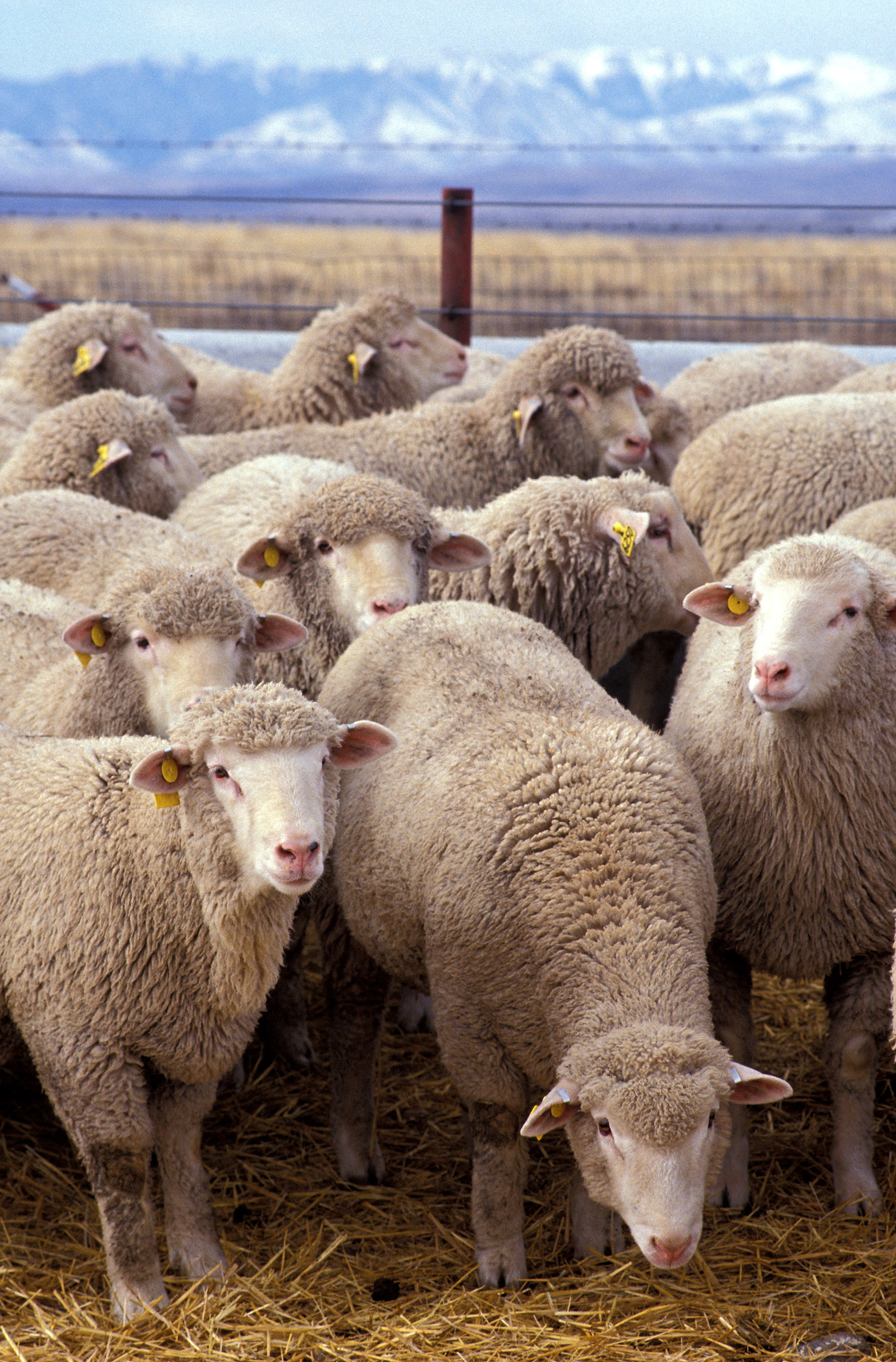
For "Ultra-Loyal Sheepdog," Momus created "a simulacrum of Japanese stereotypes of English, notions of cuteness in Japan and notions of sheep [...] fascinated by the way sheep are portrayed (in Japan) — a land in which one never sees an actual sheep."

Turpsycore is a triple album dedicated to music's "so-called 'eccentrics'." Two out of three of discs are cover versions of David Bowie and Magazine/the Buzzcocks' Howard Devoto. The song "Ultra-Loyal Sheepdog" began as a Tumblr post in March 2014 when the musician wrote a biography on one of the characters in Kyary Pamyu Pamyu's "Mottai Night Land" video.

The title is a deliberate misspelling of Terpsichore, the muse for joy and dance in Greek mythology. Likewise, the name is a nod to turpentine and turpitude. Also relating to Greek mythology, Momus is the god of mockery and blame.

The color palette is a reference to Greece's polychrome technique. His later album Glyptothek was published in the same year. Songs from Turpsycore and from other 2000s albums Bambi, Bibliotek, and Glyptothek were recollected in the Cherry Red Records anthology Pubic Intellectual.

== Production ==
The content of the first disc was originally published by Sony Music Japan. The second and third discs of Turpsycore were recorded at the "cabaret concerts" in London's Cafe Oto in September 2014. The cover is designed by Hagen Verleger. It was nominated by the German Design Council for the German Design Award.

== Reception ==
Bristol's Cube Microplex staff called Turpsycore "a triple disc spectacular." The Japan Times's Devon Fisher commented "[Momus] pays proper tribute to the artists — some famous, some less so — who, like him in his Shibuya-kei days, brought a more literate, worldly and bizarre perspective to the realm of popular culture, refusing to stagnate or get 'over-familiar and over-sold.'" Zitty's Thorsten Glotzmann said it was "thoroughly enigmatic and bizarre – overloaded with literary, film-historical and pop-cultural references."

Heathen Harvest staff reviewed it favorably stating "A good Momus album plus a two bonus discs of off-kilter covers of David Bowie and Howard Devoto songs. What's not to like about it?" PopMatters's Dave Heaton remarked the album was "a truly eccentric three-disc set." CDM's Peter Kirn called the Bowie disc "unsurprising" but the Devoto covers "were just what I (didn't know I) needed – a set of songs tackling sexual ambiguity and anxiety from a singer who was born to play the part."

== Track listing ==
Turpsy
No.	Title	Length
1.	"Bathyscaphe"	2:27
2.	"System of Usher"	3:28
3.	"The Dowser"	3:02
4.	"The Boy Camille"	3:23
5.	"The Hiker"	3:00
6.	"Cameo"	3:05
7.	"The Brutalist"	2:57
8.	"Ultra-Loyal Sheepdog"	2:54
9.	"The Spider"	2:39
10.	"The Painter"	3:02
11.	"Catholic App"	4:06
12.	"Unreconstructed"	3:33
13.	"Following"	3:51
14.	"Spore"	4:02
15.	"The Driver"	3:59
16.	"The Hate Horse"	2:20
17.	"Foxy Little Otter"	2:12

Dybbuk
No.	Title	Length
1.	"The Bewlay Brothers"	5:18
2.	"Joe the Lion"	3:30
3.	"Be My Wife"	3:04
4.	"African Night Flight"	2:46
5.	"Sweet Thing"	6:23
6.	"DJ"	4:27
7.	"Time"	3:47
8.	"Lady Grinning Soul"	3:57
9.	"Love Is Lost"	3:35
10.	"Ashes to Ashes"	4:29
11.	"Candidate"	5:06
12.	"Conversation Piece"	3:45
13.	"The Drowned Girl"	2:27
14.	"Letter to Hermione"	3:33
15.	"Uncle Arthur"	2:11
16.	"Where Are We Now?"	4:23
17.	"Absolute Beginners"	4:51
18.	"Life on Mars"	3:53

Harvard
No.	Title	Length
1.	"Motorcade"	5:26
2.	"Cut-Out Shapes"	4:34
3.	"Because You're Frightened"	3:57
4.	"Upside Down"	3:56
5.	"Back to Nature"	6:36
6.	"Lady 21"	3:33
7.	"Pound"	4:35
8.	"Rainy Season"	4:57
9.	"Ticket"	3:47
10.	"Philadelphia"	3:31
11.	"You Never Knew Me"	5:21
12.	"Friends of Mine"	3:22
13.	"Parade"	5:00
14.	"Of Course Howard"	4:47
15.	"Smoking Mirror"	3:48
