= Kris Kirk =

British journalist

Kris Kirk, full name Christopher Pius Mary Kirk, (1950 – 27 April 1993) was an English gay activist, journalist and author who became well known as a pop music journalist in the 1980s.

He was brought up in Carlisle by Catholic parents. From 1970 until 1973 he studied American Literature at the University of Nottingham, where he first came out as an openly gay man and founded the university's first Gay Liberation Society. When he arrived in Nottingham he was already Kris. He performed in several student drama productions, (on one notable occasion appearing as the Devil in Christopher Marlowe's Dr Faustus, completely naked apart from a large leather phallus), and after graduating he obtained a number of theatre jobs, including working as a theatrical dresser for Tommy Steele and Benny Hill.

In the early 1980s he moved to London, and changed the spelling of his name to "Kristopher", writing under the byline of "Kris Kirk". He worked as a journalist for Gay News and Gay Times and in 1984 he also began writing about the pop scene for Melody Maker, becoming the first openly gay music journalist in the UK. He also wrote numerous freelance articles for music publications, including Smash Hits and The Face and for other publications such as The Guardian, New York Rocker and City Limits.

In 1988, Kris Kirk moved to rural Wales to open a secondhand book shop with his boyfriend, photographer Ed Heath. In 1991 he was diagnosed with AIDS and reluctantly returned to London for treatment. He went blind the following year. With equipment supplied by the RNIB, he was able to carry on writing, and in June 1992, he wrote an article on his condition for Gay Times, 'Descent into Darkness'; becoming one of the first people with AIDS to come out publicly.

"As long as I have my friends, my family, my fags, my coffee, my opera tapes and my writing I guess I shall tootle along, even though I may not have all my coat buttons done up properly. Life is for living and I am trying to live it as well as I can. But I suppose that I feel that when death finally comes I shall be ready for it. Perhaps that is what life is all about."

== Published works ==
Kris Kirk collaborated with Ed Heath, to write Men in Frocks (pub 1984), an illustrated survey of the history of British crossdressing, ranging from Army camp shows during World War II to 1980s rock musicians. Another book about gay men and pop, provisionally titled The Vinyl Closet was commissioned but never finished.

A collection of Kris Kirk's journalism entitled A Boy Called Mary: Kris Kirk's Greatest Hits was published in 1999 by Millivres Books (ISBN 1-873741-33-2) with a foreword by Boy George and an introduction by Gay Times editor Richard Smith. It contains thirty-four articles and essays on pop music on personalities including Little Richard, Brian Epstein, Dusty Springfield, Jayne County, Sylvester, Village People, Tom Robinson, Culture Club, Frankie Goes to Hollywood, Bronski Beat, Divine, The Communards, Erasure, Pet Shop Boys, Marc Almond, Kenny Everett, Morrissey, and Boy George.

A review in The Wire in August 1999 stated that:

"The confluence of his pink socialist politics with the emerging likes of Boy George, Bronski Beat and The Pet Shop Boys makes for fascinating and historic reading, but he wasn't only interested in those involved in perverting the Top Ten. Sitting alongside the pieces on those acts are encounters with artists who moved away from a pop starting point towards less mainstream zones (Marc Almond, Marianne Faithfull) and still further offshore from the pop coastline, the likes of Diamanda Galás, Momus and the musically and sexually hardcore dance collective Tongueman."

In 1986, Channel 4 broadcast a drama documentary by Paul Oremland about Kris Kirk's life, titled A Boy Called Mary.
