= Scobberlotchers =

Studio album by Momus
- Released: 9 September 2016
- Recorded: June and August 2016, Osaka, Japan
- Length: 1:05:38
- Label: American Patchwork (AMPATCH018)

Momus chronology
Glyptothek (2015)	Scobberlotchers (2016)	Pillycock (2017)

Scobberlotchers is a 2016 album by Scottish musician Momus. It was released on 9 September 2016 by independent record label American Patchwork on CD and distributed by Darla Records.

== Background ==
The album was recorded between June and August 2016 in Osaka, Japan where Momus resided at the time. Momus has stated that the LP has been his "polemical response to Brexit and Trump."

== Reception ==
Darla Records founder James Agren praised the album saying "[Momus]'s perspective/world view/filter is my absolute favorite of all artists today." Yahoo! Music's Dave DiMartino ranked Scobberlotchers third on his list "Best Albums of 2016." Now Then's Zachary Freeman reviewed the album favorably with "references to figures as diverse as Ezra Pound, Henry Darger, Theresa May and Fernando Pessoa demonstrate Momus's propensity to tackle more subject matter in an individual album than most groups achieve in their entire discography."

== Track listing ==
No.	Title	Length
1.	"Heian"	3:22
2.	"Tick of the Clock"	3:47
3.	"Art and Design"	2:51
4.	"Little Girls"	2:38
5.	"Cabin Porn"	2:32
6.	"The Death of Empedokles"	2:51
7.	"Icek Judko"	2:59
8.	"Neo-Weimar"	2:48
9.	"The Brothers"	3:39
10.	"Perlenschwein"	4:07
11.	"Bullshit"	2:29
12.	"Bashibazouks"	3:20
13.	"Year Zero"	4:51
14.	"What Are Facts?"	3:26
15.	"Imperial"	2:33
16.	"The Counting Song"	2:29
17.	"Pessoa"	3:59
18.	"Ass"	3:26
19.	"Hatecrush"	4:04
20.	"The Torch"	3:27
