= The Little Red Songbook =

Studio album by Momus
- Released: 1998
- Length: 73:28
- Label: Le Grand Magistery
- Producer: Momus

Momus chronology
Ping Pong (1997)	The Little Red Songbook (1998)	Stars Forever (1999)

Professional ratings
Review scores
Source	Rating
AllMusic	4/5 stars
Pitchfork	6.4/10
The Rolling Stone Album Guide	2.5/5 stars

The Little Red Songbook is the twelfth studio album by Scottish musician Momus, released by Le Grand Magistery in 1998. Momus describes the album's style as part of his "analog baroque" phase: "an odd blend of classicism and kitschy futurism." The album features several karaoke versions of its songs, which were used for a singing contest; the winners of the contest appear on the 1999 album Stars Forever.

The title was inspired by the controversial Danish book The Little Red Schoolbook.

== Lawsuit ==
The original release of The Little Red Songbook contained the song "Walter Carlos", which postulated that, when time travel becomes possible, transgender musician Wendy Carlos could go back in time and marry her pre-transition self who was known as Walter Carlos.

In 1998, Carlos sued Momus for $22 million (equivalent to $34.6 million in 2025) over the song. The case was settled out of court, with Momus agreeing to remove it from the album and owing $30,000 (equivalent to $59,259 in 2025) in legal fees. Subsequent releases of the album do not include the song. Momus fundraised the money needed to pay the fees in a novel manner. The first 30 songs on his next album Stars Forever (1999) were commissioned by persons or groups who paid him $1,000 each to write and record a song about themselves; meaning, after 30 songs, Momus raised the $30,000 needed.

== Track listing ==
All tracks are written by Momus.

No.	Title	Length
1.	"Old Friend, New Flame"	2:05
2.	"MC Escher"	3:31
3.	"Who Is Mr. Jones?"	2:09
4.	"Harry K-Tel"	2:05
5.	"Lucretia Borgia"	2:50
6.	"How to Spot an Invert"	1:42
7.	"Everyone I Have Ever Slept With"	2:43
8.	"Born to Be Adored"	4:14
9.	"Coming in a Girl's Mouth"	1:34
10.	"What Are You Wearing?"	5:32
11.	"The New Decameron"	1:43
12.	"The Symphonies of Beethoven"	4:13
13.	"Tragedy and Farce"	2:38
14.	"Miss X, an Ex-Lover"	2:09
15.	"A White Oriental Flower"	4:49
16.	"Some Mistranslations"	2:02
17.	"The Ugly Sister"	1:04
18.	"Welcome to My Show Trial"	6:03
19.	"Old Friend, New Flame" (Karaoke Version)	2:06
20.	"Tragedy and Farce" (Karaoke Version)	2:39
21.	"The New Decameron" (Karaoke Version)	1:46
22.	"Coming in a Girl's Mouth" (Karaoke Version)	1:36
23.	"Miss X, an Ex-Lover" (Karaoke Version)	2:10
24.	"Harry K-Tel" (Karaoke Version)	2:07
25.	"Who Is Mr. Jones?" (Karaoke Version)	2:20
26.	"How to Spot an Invert" (Karaoke Version)	1:44
27.	"The Symphonies of Beethoven" (Karaoke Version)	4:07

Original edition
No.	Title	Length
1.	"Old Friend, New Flame"	2:05
2.	"MC Escher"	3:31
3.	"Who Is Mr. Jones?"	2:09
4.	"Harry K-Tel"	2:05
5.	"Lucretia Borgia"	2:50
6.	"How to Spot an Invert"	1:42
7.	"Everyone I Have Ever Slept With"	2:43
8.	"Born to Be Adored"	4:14
9.	"Coming in a Girl's Mouth"	1:34
10.	"What Are You Wearing?"	5:32
11.	"The New Decameron"	1:43
12.	"Walter Carlos"	2:18
13.	"The Symphonies of Beethoven"	4:13
14.	"Tragedy and Farce"	2:38
15.	"Miss X, an Ex-Lover"	2:09
16.	"A White Oriental Flower"	4:49
17.	"Old Friend, New Flame" (Karaoke Version)	2:06
18.	"Tragedy and Farce" (Karaoke Version)	2:39
19.	"The New Decameron" (Karaoke Version)	1:46
20.	"Coming in a Girl's Mouth" (Karaoke Version)	1:36
21.	"Miss X, an Ex-Lover" (Karaoke Version)	2:10
22.	"Harry K-Tel" (Karaoke Version)	2:07
23.	"Who Is Mr. Jones?" (Karaoke Version)	2:20
24.	"Walter Carlos" (Karaoke Version)	2:18
25.	"How to Spot an Invert" (Karaoke Version)	1:44
26.	"The Symphonies of Beethoven" (Karaoke Version)	4:07
