= Bambi (Momus album) =

Studio album by Momus
- Released: 30 September 2013
- Length: 41:08
- Label: American Patchwork (AMPATCH014)
- Producer: Momus

Momus chronology
Bibliotek (2012)	Bambi (2013)	Turpsycore (2015)

Bambi is a 2013 album by Scottish musician Momus. It was released on 30 September 2013 by independent record label American Patchwork on CD and distributed by Darla Records.

== Background ==
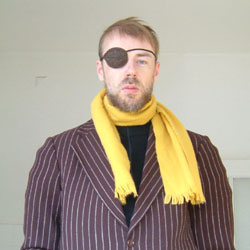
"I did something I'd been planning to do ever since 2010, when I left Berlin and, about to put my tapes into storage, digitised a lot of old cassettes I'd made in the late 1970s in Edinburgh when I was a teenager listening to Eno and New Wave. I realised that I'd actually invented a highly original style which I lost later by fitting my songs into band or studio or software formats."

The first installment of MOMUSMCCLYMONT, a collaboration with ex-Orange Juice member David McClymont, was released in the same year. Songs from Bambi and from other 2000s albums Bibliotek, Glyptothek, and Turpsycore were recollected in the Cherry Red Records anthology Pubic Intellectual.

== Production ==
=== Cover ===
The cover was designed by James Goggin and the illustration by Barcelona-based illustrator Miju Lee. The cover also features a typeface called "São Paulo Shimbun" based on the masthead typography from a Japanese-language newspaper printed in São Paulo, Brazil. In 2011, Momus discovered a copy of the newspaper at the Center for Overseas Migration and Cultural Interaction in Kobe, Japan and wrote "I want someone to make a typeface based on that masthead so I can use it for a future album cover."

=== Music ===
Momus did not use click tracks, MIDI, nor reverb to produce Bambi. Instead, he used a broken guitar, a broken piano, a condenser microphone, another cassette player for distortion, and a couple cassette recorders. For percussion, he used an Anglepoise lamp and pencils. For the guitar, he used Kleenex facial tissues to dampen the strings and inserted the microphone beneath to make kalimbalike sounds. For the piano, he prepared sounds in "the Cagean manner."

== Themes ==
The album features songs about Ludwig van Beethoven, Molly Drake, dystopias, evangelism, and Klaus Kinski. "The Ephebophobe," set in the year 2047, is about a person being punished by having Google physically removed from his brain.

== Reception ==
The Honest Ulsterman's Darran Anderson praised the album saying "Bambi makes me imagine twirling a radio dial through lo-fidelity broadcasts from another world, despite it being very much our own." Rolling Stone's Dave DiMartino reviewed Bambi favorably with "[i]ntricate, subtle stuff, which might have eternal value were it not loaded with catchphrases and tech-lingo that will render it charmingly dated in milliseconds."

== Track listing ==
No.	Title	Length
1.	"The Blind Boy"	3:24
2.	"Bambi"	2:47
3.	"Deer Wife"	2:49
4.	"The Fallacy"	3:54
5.	"Love Isn't a Right"	3:29
6.	"The Ephebophobe"	2:51
7.	"Lipgloss"	2:36
8.	"Kinski Gets Angry"	3:09
9.	"Song of Norway"	2:29
10.	"Hammered Horse"	2:17
11.	"Pots"	2:50
12.	"Skriptorium"	3:02
13.	"Crispbread Pagoda"	3:46
14.	"For Elise"	1:45
