= Circus Maximus (Momus album) =

Studio album by Momus
- Released: 15 January 1986
- Recorded: September 1985
- Studio: Alaska Studio
- Genre: Folk, indie
- Length: 33:47
- Label: él Records
- Producer: Momus

Momus chronology
Circus Maximus (1986)	The Poison Boyfriend (1987)

Singles from Circus Maximus
- 1. "Nicky" Released: 1986

Professional ratings
Review scores
Source	Rating
AllMusic	2.5/5 stars

Circus Maximus is the debut album by Scottish musician Momus, released on 15 January 1986 on Creation Records. It deals primarily with Biblical and Ancient Roman themes, making reference to figures such as Saul, St. Sebastian, Lucretia, and Solomon. The title, Circus Maximus, refers to the ancient Roman chariot racing and entertainment venue of the same name.

== Background and influences ==
The Guardian has characterised the lyrical content of Circus Maximus as a "skewed reading of certain classical and biblical themes," adding that "the urgent, whispering [Momus] professes himself a masochistic St. Sebastian ('preferring the ache to the aspirin') and sings of 'The Rape of Lucretia' like a Morrissey who had not stopped at an enthusiasm for Oscar Wilde but mined the whole decadent tradition: Pater, Swinburne, Huysmans."

== Track listing ==
All songs written by Nicholas Currie (Momus).

1. "Lucky Like St. Sebastian" - 3:19
2. "The Lesson Of Sodom (According To Lot)" - 3:43
3. "John The Baptist Jones" - 3:12
4. "King Solomon's Song And Mine" - 3:17
5. "Little Lord Obedience" - 5:13
6. "The Day The Circus Came To Town" - 3:25
7. "The Rape Of Lucretia" - 4:57
8. "Paper Wraps Rock" - 3:58
9. "Rules Of The Game Of Quoits" - 4:03
10. "Nicky" - 4:16
11. "Don't Leave" - 3:35
12. "See A Friend In Tears" - 4:12

== Personnel ==
- Backing Vocals – Jane Davies
- Engineer – Noël Thomson
- Producer – Momus
- Synthesizer [Emulator 2] – Neill Martin
