= Stars Forever =

Studio album by Momus
- Released: 1999
- Length: 129:14
- Label: Le Grand Magistery
- Producer: Momus

Momus chronology
The Little Red Songbook (1998)	Stars Forever (1999)	Folktronic (2001)

Professional ratings
Review scores
Source	Rating
AllMusic	4.5/5 stars
Melody Maker	4.5/5 stars
Pitchfork	3.8/10
The Rolling Stone Album Guide	2/5 stars
Uncut	5/5 stars

Stars Forever is the thirteenth studio album by Scottish musician Momus, released by Le Grand Magistery in 1999. The album represents part of Momus's "analog-baroque" phase.

Momus wrote thirty songs for Stars Forever, each about a person or group who commissioned a song for the price of $1,000. The funds raised went towards costs incurred from a lawsuit against Momus by Wendy Carlos. Patrons included fellow musicians the Minus 5 and Keigo Oyamada, artist Jeff Koons, retail store Other Music, and record label Minty Fresh.

The album also features eight winners of a karaoke parody contest in which participants were invited to submit recordings of themselves singing over instrumentals included on Momus's previous album, The Little Red Songbook (1998).

== Track listing ==
All tracks are written by Momus.

Disc one
No.	Title	Length
1.	"The Minus 5"	3:34
2.	"Akiko Masuda"	2:48
3.	"Steven Zeeland"	3:33
4.	"Mika Akutsu"	3:06
5.	"Stephanie Pappas"	3:41
6.	"Kokoro Hirai"	3:07
7.	"Stefano Zarelli"	2:49
8.	"Paolo Rumi"	4:23
9.	"Natsuko Tayama"	2:27
10.	"Girlie Action"	2:15
11.	"Mai Noda"	3:07
12.	"Robert Dye"	3:17
13.	"Florence Manlik"	2:17
14.	"Adam Green"	3:33
15.	"Maf"	2:32
16.	"Other Music"	2:07
17.	"Tinnitus"	2:06
18.	"3D Corporation"	2:44
19.	"Miles Franklin"	3:36

Disc two
No.	Title	Length
1.	"Shawn Krueger"	3:35
2.	"Jeff Koons"	3:42
3.	"Noah Brill"	2:56
4.	"Team Clermont"	3:25
5.	"Brent Busboom"	3:19
6.	"Indiepop List"	5:22
7.	"Keigo Oyamada"	3:06
8.	"Minty Fresh"	1:55
9.	"Milton Jacobson"	3:05
10.	"Reckless Records"	2:10
11.	"Karin Komoto"	3:07
12.	"New Flame, Same Old Story" (performed by Christian Carl)	2:31
13.	"Not Intended for Children" (performed by Bill Hardy)	1:52
14.	"Coming on an Intern's Dress" (performed by Mr. Kate Jenkins)	1:29
15.	"Nicky My Friend" (performed by Diego Zapparoli and Paola)	2:06
16.	"Mr. Jones" (performed by Jack Curtis Dubowsky)	2:19
17.	"The Taste of Pink Champagne" (performed by El Topo)	2:07
18.	"Onan the Barbarian" (performed by Richard Knowles)	1:33
19.	"Suggestion to Jealous Men" (performed by Olivier Schopfer)	1:43
20.	"A Twenty-One (21) Minute Interview with Momus"	21:13
