= 20 Vodka Jellies =

Compilation album by Momus
- Released: 1996
- Length: 73:13
- Label: Cherry Red
- Producer: Momus

Momus chronology
| The Philosophy of Momus (1995) | 20 Vodka Jellies (1996) | Ping Pong (1997) |

Professional ratings
Review scores
| Source | Rating |
|---|---|
| AllMusic | 4.5/5 stars |
| NME | 7/10 |
| Q | 3/5 stars |
| The Rolling Stone Album Guide | 4/5 stars |

20 Vodka Jellies is a compilation album by Scottish musician Momus, released in 1996. The album's cover describes it as "an assortment of curiosities and rarities", and it is a collection of unreleased demos, a few new songs, B-sides, and outtakes. Much of the album reflects Momus's involvement with Shibuya-kei music. It has been described as "one of Momus' strongest and most accessible efforts."

== Track listing ==
All tracks are written by Momus, except where noted.

| No. | Title | Writer(s) | Length |
|---|---|---|---|
| 1. | "I Am a Kitten" | | 2:48 |
| 2. | "Vogue Bambini" | | 3:05 |
| 3. | "The Poisoners" | | 3:13 |
| 4. | "Nikon 2" | | 3:29 |
| 5. | "Giapponese a Roma" | | 3:23 |
| 6. | "Paolo" | | 5:05 |
| 7. | "The End of History" | | 4:07 |
| 8. | "London 1888" | | 4:30 |
| 9. | "Streetlamp Soliloquy" | Momus; Alison Spritzler-Rose | 4:18 |
| 10. | "An Inflatable Doll" | | 2:49 |
| 11. | "Saved" | | 3:40 |
| 12. | "Someone" | | 3:33 |
| 13. | "Howard Hughes" | | 3:16 |
| 14. | "Three Beasts" | | 3:57 |
| 15. | "Good Morning World" | | 3:33 |
| 16. | "Germania" | | 3:23 |
| 17. | "The Girl with No Body" | | 2:49 |
| 18. | "Radiant Night" | | 4:42 |
| 19. | "Orgasm Addict" | Howard Devoto; Pete Shelley | 4:22 |
| 20. | "Nobody" | | 4:12 |
