= Don't Stop the Night =

Album by Momus

Studio album by Momus
- Released: 1989
- Length: 50:00
- Label: Creation Records (CRE 052); Rough Trade (RTD 137)

Momus chronology
Tender Pervert (1988)	Don't Stop the Night (1989)	Hippopotamomus (1991)

Don't Stop the Night is the fourth studio album by Scottish musician Momus. It was released in 1989 through Creation Records internationally, and in Germany on Rough Trade. The album featured Momus' highest-charting single to date, "The Hairstyle of the Devil", which reached No. 94 on the UK Singles Chart for the week of 30 April 1989.

== Background ==
Following the release of 1988's Tender Pervert, Momus recorded a new single, "The Hairstyle of the Devil", at London's Scarf Studio, which quickly saw success in the UK.

The album's working title was Sexual Crimes of the Professional Classes. Momus called it his "most British album", situating the record in the context of Thatcherite Britain, the AIDS crisis, the rise of the yuppie subculture, and increased austerity.

Professional ratings
Review scores
Source	Rating
AllMusic	4/5 stars
NME	9/10

== Reception ==
Don't Stop the Night received generally positive reviews from critics. Melody Maker's Ian Gittins called the album "superbly realised" and "clinically crafted", praising the singer's transition to more electronic instrumentation. NME critic and radio presenter Stuart Maconie called Don't Stop the Night "Christmas come early", rating the album 9/10 and adding that "only a fool could ignore this record". Sounds magazine, like other reviewers, praised the album's sexually-eccentric and highly-referential lyrics. AllMusic critic Steve Huey ranked the album 4/5 stars, praising the album's lyrics and production but suggesting that the latter half of the album is less memorable. Kris Kirk of the Gay Times compared Momus' lyrics to the songs of Morrissey.

The album's lead single, "The Hairstyle of the Devil", peaked at No. 94 on the UK Singles Chart in April to May 1989. The single also became a local hit in San Francisco, where it reached No. 32 on the KITS end-of-year "Top 105.3 of 1989" chart. It was rated "Single of the Week" by Sounds for 4 November 1989.

== Track listing ==
All tracks are written by Momus.

No.	Title	Length
1.	"Trust Me, I'm A Doctor"	5:20
2.	"Righthand Heart"	5:04
3.	"Lord Of The Dance"	2:59
4.	"Lifestyles Of The Rich And Famous"	3:35
5.	"How Do You Find My Sister?"	5:18
6.	"The Hairstyle Of The Devil"	4:31
7.	"Don't Stop The Night"	4:33
8.	"Amongst Women Only"	4:03
9.	"The Guitar Lesson"	3:52
10.	"The Cabriolet"	4:24
11.	"Shaftesbury Avenue"	5:57
Total length:		50:00

== Personnel ==
- All songs written by Momus
- Cover photography by Michael Daks
- Cover design by Vici Macdonald
