= Larme de Crocodile =

Studio album by Kahimi Karie
- Released: March 25, 1997
- Genre: Shibuya-kei
- Length: 41:26
- Label: Crue-L
- Producer: Kahimi Karie; Yasuharu Konishi; Coba; Momus; Philippe Katerine; Aiha Higurashi

Kahimi Karie chronology
Larme de Crocodile (1997)	K.K.K.K.K. (1998)

Singles from Larme de Crocodile
- 1. "Tiny King Kong" Released: February 14, 1997

Professional ratings
Review scores
Source	Rating
AllMusic	3/5 stars

Larme de Crocodile (クロコダイルの涙, transl. Crocodile Tears) is the debut studio album by Japanese musician Kahimi Karie. It was released on March 25, 1997 by Crue-L Records.

== Background ==
Released after a string of six EPs, Larme de Crocodile draws from several musical genres, including jazz, French chanson and electronic music. Karie explained that with the album, she "wanted to make really, really melancholic music, to be alone".

Larme de Crocodile features five songs written by Scottish musician Momus, including two with music by accordionist Coba. Momus' own recording of one of these songs, "Lolitapop Dollhouse", appears on his album Ping Pong, released the same year. Larme de Crocodile also features collaborations with Yasuharu Konishi of Pizzicato Five, Aiha Higurashi of Seagull Screaming Kiss Her Kiss Her and French musician Philippe Katerine.

== Track listing ==
No.	Title	Writer(s)	Length
1.	"Alcohol"	Yasuharu Konishi	5:52
2.	"Superfreak"	Coba; Momus	4:36
3.	"David Hamilton"	Momus	4:15
4.	"Electrophone"	Philippe Katerine	2:36
5.	"Paris, Texas"	Aiha Higurashi	2:59
6.	"Lolitapop Dollhouse"	Momus	4:09
7.	"Tiny King Kong"	Coba; Momus	5:17
8.	"Cat from the Future"	Momus	5:14
9.	"Watashi no Jinsei, Jinsei no Natsu" (私の人生、人生の夏)	Konishi	4:46
10.	"Les Leçons de français"	Katerine	1:42
Total length:			41:26

== Charts ==
Chart (1997)	Peak position
Japanese Albums (Oricon)	40
