= The Poison Boyfriend =

Studio album by Momus
- Released: July 1987
- Genre: Folk, indie
- Length: 42:33
- Label: Creation Records
- Producer: Julian Standen

Momus chronology
Circus Maximus (1986)	The Poison Boyfriend (1987)	Tender Pervert (1988)

Singles from The Poison Boyfriend
- 1. "Murderers, the Hopes of Women" Released: March 1987

The Poison Boyfriend is the second album by Scottish musician Momus, released in 1987 on Creation Records. After the critical success of Momus' Biblical-themed and stripped down debut album Circus Maximus (1986), Momus left él Records and signed with Creation Records after he bonded with record label boss Alan McGee. His first release for the label, The Poison Boyfriend is a song cycle that features a full band; its first half features acoustic-based singer-songwriter songs with cabaret pop influences, while the more upbeat second half features synthesisers and drum machines.

Lyrically, The Poison Boyfriend is broad in its subject matter, though largely psychosexual, with lyrics including themes of sexual depravity and voyeurism and writing styles such as character sketches. "Murderers, the Hope of Women" was released as a single ahead of the album's release. Upon its release, The Poison Boyfriend garnered favourable reviews from critics. NME named the album one of the best of 1987, while Fact Magazine later named the album the 81st best album of the 1980s. Momus would later develop upon the album's sexual themes on later recordings.

== Background ==
Momus (Nicholas "Nick" Currie) released his debut album, Circus Maximus, on él Records in 1986, which, in addition to being a critical success, became the label's most commercially successful release. Stylistically, the album was stripped down and featured heavy Biblical references. Circus Maximus caught the attention of Creation Records boss Alan McGee, who then signed Momus to Creation. While the signing was "something of a leap for Creation," given how Momus' literate and caustic lyrics departed from the vaguer lyrics typical of those on the label's roster, Momus and McGee had shared interests in decadence and sex; Momus recalled "I was getting a bit of press in The Face and the NME, and I think Alan's interest might have been perked by the fact I'd written an article about Jacques Brel in which I said that Brel was more thrilling and dangerous than a thousand Jesus and Mary Chains, and Alan had just lost them at that point, so maybe something in that resonated."

Momus felt he would be greeted with more attention on Creation Records, while also conceding that being signed to the label would aesthetically "be a more toxic environment in some ways and there would be a certain kind of hideous Sixties revivalism saying it all goes back to the Pebbles compilation." The Poison Boyfriend was recorded with producer Julian Standen and was engineered by Douglas Morris. Momus used a full band on The Poison Boyfriend, consisting of bassist Fein O'Lochlainn, drummer Terry Neilson, keyboardist Dean Klerat and extra percussionist Arun G. Shendurnikar.

== Music and lyrics ==
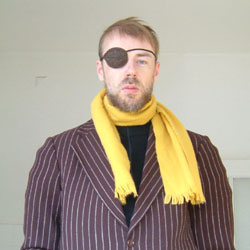
Momus, pictured in 2005.

With Momus enlisting a backup band for The Poison Boyfriend, the album is a departure from his debut album, and has been described by writer Richard King as a "Gallic-flavoured song cycle." The first seven songs on the album add elements of cabaret pop, such as French accordion and waltzes, to Momus' singer-songwriter format influenced by Leonard Cohen, a style described by The Rough Guide to Rock as subdued and sometimes reminiscent of Nick Drake, whereas the last four songs are more upbeat and energetic, featuring synthesisers and drum machines. Several songs, such as "Sex for the Disabled", are said to border on synthpop.

Lyrically, The Poison Boyfriend departs from the obscure religious themes of Circus Maximus, instead displaying a wider frame of lyrical reference, most notably incorporating a psychosexual theme that Momus would later develop on later releases. King felt the album "shone a light into a meditative and reflective voyeur's idea of romance." Subjects throughout the album include sexual depravity, prurient postcards, "nested despair" and acerbic tale-telling, with the lyrical style incorporating character sketches, complex symbolism, flowery language and elaborate metaphors. Momus felt his exploring of taboo subjects was largely due to "being ashamed of my proper, middle-class upbringing."

"What Will Death Be Like?" makes use of repetition, with a simplistic pattern repeated throughout its seven-minute duration. Of the songs on side two, "Situation Comedy Blues" incorporates a mock-Motown Sound, while "Sex for the Disabled" is a quasi-soul "horny sex rap" in a Phil Spector-style Wall of Sound arrangement that Doug Brod of Trouser Press felt was a pastiche of Barry White, and which Huey compared to Prince's "Purple Rain". Lyrically, the "comically torchy" song is a surreal allegory concerning Thatcher's Britain, making note of Margaret Thatcher's contemporary "swerve in priorities." Described by Huey as "disarming" and the album's biggest stylistic change, "Closer to You" is a deliberate self-parody in which Momus "croons horny, confessional come-ons like a bookish Barry White." One writer felt the song was "a claustrophobic and uncomfortably personal exploration of obsession and longing."

== Reception ==
Professional ratings
Review scores
Source	Rating
AllMusic	3/5 stars

In 1986, the album was promoted with the "Murderers, the Hope of Women" twelve-inch single, containing the first three songs from the album. Released in July 1987 on Creation Records, his first album on the label, The Poison Boyfriend received favourable critical reception, and in his book How Soon is Now?: The Madmen and Mavericks who made Independent Music 1975–2005, Richard King, noting Momus' ambitions of the album, felt that the opening lyrics to "Closer to You"–"Maybe you're the Circle Line girl,"– were muttered "with a claustrophobic intensity" that confirmed Momums' ambitions were "set in an entirely different context from the rest of Creation's roster." Momus would expand upon the sexual themes of The Poison Boyfriend on later albums.

In a retrospective review, Doug Brod of Trouser Press wrote that "on The Poison Boyfriend, Currie dispenses with the religious imagery and enlists a backup band, while taking a less studied approach to consistently ace material," while finding Momus' "bayonet wit" to be most obvious on "Sex for the Disabled," which he felt was "a horny faux-soul sex rap with everything but the heavy breathing." Steve Huey of AllMusic was more reserved, rating the album three stars out of five. While finding issue with "a sense that the author is hiding behind his own cleverness," he nonetheless conceded that the album marked a leap forward in Momus' career, and concluded: "The Poison Boyfriend does reward some of the effort it demands, and points the way toward Momus' more fully realized Creation albums." In The Rough Guide to Rock, the album is favourably assessed and named "a magic creation."

NME ranked the album at number 39 in their list of the 50 best albums of 1987. In 2012, NME included it in their list of "20 Lost Albums Ripe for Rediscovery," with Brett Anderson of Suede praising the album, saying: "There’s a beautiful hazy melancholy to much of this record, his second release, which I think he lost as the songs became more twisted and intellectualised on later albums." NME then included it in the list's extended "100 Great Albums You've Never Heard" form, where Anderson elaborated: "there was a delicate, less brazen element to the poetry, perfectly capturing the mood of Jacques Brel with their beautifully intense indifference." In 2013, Fact magazine ranked the album at number 81 in its list of "The 100 Best Albums of the 1980s," writing "The Poison Boyfriend confounds as often as it delights – if Private Eye's Pseuds Corner concerned itself with the Creation catalogue, Currie would be a regular fixture – but as far as spooked, naughty indie goes, The Poison Boyfriend is in a (top set) class of its own."

== Track listing ==
All songs written by Nicholas Currie (Momus).

1. "The Gatecrasher" – 4:58
2. "Violets" – 4:56
3. "Islington John" – 5:15
4. "Three Wars" – 5:46
5. "Flame into Being" – 5:22
6. "Situation Comedy Blues" – 3:48
7. "Sex for the Disabled" – 4:51
8. "Closer to You" – 7:32

== Personnel ==
- Nicholas Currie (Momus) – songwriter
- Julian Standen – producer
- Fein O'Lochlainn – bass
- Vici MacDonald – sleeve design
- Terry Neilson – drums
- Douglas Morris – engineer
- Dean Klerat – keyboards
- Arun G. Shendurnikar – percussion
- Nick Wesolowski – front cover and insert photography
