= Bernthøler =

Belgian pop/avant garde band

- Origin: Belgium
- Genres: Pop, new wave
- Years active: 1981–1985
- Labels: Putovsky, Blue Feather, Blanco y Negro, LTM, Starman Records
- Past members: Drita Kotaji; Simon Rigot; Manuel Poutte; Pol Fourmois; Pierre Sorvil

Bernthøler was a pop/avant garde band formed in Brussels, Belgium, active between 1981 and 1985.

== History ==
Originally just a "musical experiment" named after a line in a Virna Lindt song, the band found surprise success with their single "My Suitor"/"Emotions", recorded in August 1983. Championed in the UK by DJ John Peel and appearing in his Festive Fifty for 1984, the group signed to the UK label Blanco y Negro. The band released one more record, a long version of "My Suitor" with additional parts by Wim Mertens and Drita Kotaji and, despite occasional gigs, disbanded in 1985.

In 1999, radio station Studio Brussel chose "My Suitor" for its Bass-tard remix competition, won by Buscemi - who later released his version as a single and on the album Our Girl in Havana - and the song was nominated by DJ Chantal Pattyn as "one of the classics of Belgian new wave". The song was also covered by Kahimi Karie on her 2001 album of the same name. In 1997, Simon Rigot put together a compilation of studio, live and other tracks covering the group's whole career, A History of Bernthøler 1981-1985, issued as a limited release. An official issue was published in 2004 by LTM.

A 12" vinyl issue was published in 2015 by Starman Records including the UK EP, the first single, demos from 1984 and the never-before released song "Heartbeat" from 1983.

Several other artists have covered "My Suitor", including the following:

- 1998: Figurine on Moshi Moshi compilation
- 1999: Buscemi on Our Girl in Havana
- 1999: Das Pop on Electronica for Lovers EP
- 2001: Kahimi Karie on My Suitor EP
- 2002: De Flandriens on De popklassiekers live CD
- 2011: The Arch on Engine in Void CD (with Drita Kotaji on vocals)
- 2025: Elias Rønnenfelt on Little Gods / My Suitor (feat. jonatan leandoer96 ) single

== Post-breakup ==
Keyboard player Manuel Poutte later became a film director, winning the Palme d'Or for a short film in 1992.

Singer and writer Drita Kotaji is running a solo career and is also involved, amongst other projects, in the INK. duet.

Composer, guitarist and keyboard player Simon Rigot played and recorded with many bands (Les Cactus, Resurrection), learned the sitar in the '90s and now plays synthesizer, Hammond organ and Wurlitzer electric piano with Belgian band the Narcotic Daffodils.

Bass player Pol Fourmois is working as an electro-technician at the cinema.

== Discography ==
=== Albums ===
- Merry Lines in the Sky CD (2004), LTM - 15 songs including My Suitor EP
- My Suitor Vinyl (2015), Starman Records - 12 songs including My Suitor EP

=== Singles and EPs ===
- "Japanese Garden/The Others" (1982), Putovsky
- "My Suitor/Emotions" (1983), Blue Feather
- My Suitor EP ("My Suitor"/"Pardeon Up Here"/"Lunacies"/"Emotions") (1984), Blanco y Negro

=== Compilation appearances ===
- 1992: Witlof from Belgium, Volume 4: 80's, Part 2 - "My Suitor"
- 1998: Was Het Nu 70 of 80? Vol 7 - "My Suitor", EVA
- 2005: Various - Bel 80 (Het Beste Uit De Belpop Van 1980-1989) - "My Suitor", Universal
- 2007: Les Inrockuptibles présentent: 100 trésors cachés: chansons rares & indispensables - "My Suitor", Les Inrockuptibles
- 2008: Expo 58 - De soundtrack - "My Suitor", ARS Entertainment
- 2010: Underground Belgian Wave Volume 2 - "Toys", Walhalla Records
- 2011: Belpop. De eerste 50 jaar CD5 - "My Suitor", EMI
- 2013: 80s Compilation EP - "Images", EE Tapes
- 2014: Studio Brussel - Eigen Kweek - 30 jaar Studio Brussel - "My Suitor"
- 2014: Insane 80s [EV01>EV10] - "Images - Exterieur Nuit", EE Tapes
- 2015: 100 Op 1 - De Beste Belgen (Radio 1) - "My Suitor", Warner
- 2016: Nostalgie - Belpop Classics - "My Suitor", Sony Music
