= Glyptothek (album) =

Studio album by Momus
- Released: 5 December 2015
- Length: 46:51
- Label: American Patchwork (AMPATCH017)

Momus chronology
Turpsycore (2015)	Glyptothek (2015)	Scobberlotchers (2016)

Glyptothek is an album by Scottish musician Momus. It was released on 5 December 2015 by independent record label American Patchwork on CD and distributed by Darla Records.

== Background ==
Glyptothek was recorded in Osaka, Japan. Momus began making songs for the album by working with samples from his extensive collection of old Japanese folk music. The cover is designed by Hagen Verleger. His previous album Turpsycore was published in the same year. Songs from Glyptothek and from other 2000s albums Bambi, Bibliotek, and Turpsycore were recollected in the Cherry Red Records anthology Pubic Intellectual.

== Themes ==
Song topics include befriending and naming a cockroach "Gregor," famous statues coming to life and taking nude selfies, fingerless chefs, and his penis.

== Reception ==
Professional ratings
Review scores
Source	Rating
Frontiers	4/5 stars

Yahoo! Music's Dave DiMartino ranked Glyptothek sixth on his list "Best Albums of 2015." Now Then's Zachary Freeman described the album as "combined samples of Japanese shamisen 45 records with disparate synthesisers and abrasive guitars." Zitty's Thorsten Glotzmann commented on the album's composition stating "flutes, lute and drumming samples [...] clearly sound like Japan."

Frontiers's Dominik Rothbard reviewed the album favorably with "Glyptothek is at once hilarious, heartbreaking and a bit scary, but sadly, it's not likely to drag him out of obscurity." Bashooka's Henri Wijaya put it on the list "50 Most Awesome CD Packaging & Cover Designs."

== Track listing ==
No.	Title	Length
1.	"The Art Creep"	2:49
2.	"Masks of Bebko"	2:51
3.	"Moral Mountain"	2:34
4.	"Chef Biff"	2:41
5.	"The Kappa"	2:26
6.	"The Etruscan Shepherd"	3:13
7.	"AFK"	3:06
8.	"Gregor Samsa"	2:40
9.	"Hinkfuss at the Glyptothek"	3:06
10.	"The Labourer"	2:22
11.	"The Manticore"	2:35
12.	"Electric Dionysus"	3:06
13.	"Candaulism"	3:15
14.	"Nikki Danjo"	2:37
15.	"Old Nick"	3:40
16.	"Papposilenus"	3:46
