= Shinco =

Chinese home appliance manufacturer

Jiangsu Shinco Technology Co., Ltd.
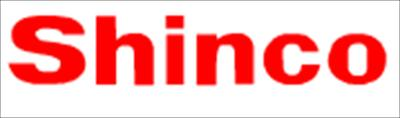
- Type: Private
- Industry: Consumer electronics
- Founded: 1980; 46 years ago
- Headquarters: Changzhou, China
- Products: Major appliances, Small appliances, Consumer electronics
- Number of employees: 8,000
- Website: www.shinco.com

Jiangsu Shinco Technology Co., Ltd. is a Chinese manufacturer of consumer electronic appliances, which include air conditioner/heat pumps, TVs, DVD-Players, GPS and washing machines. Established in 1980, the company has 8,000 employees at 12 manufacturing plants. In 2003 the company was producing five million DVD players a year.
