= The Happy Family (band) =

Scottish 1980s post punk band

- Origin: Scotland
- Genres: Post punk
- Years active: 1981 – 1983
- Labels: 4AD Records; Les Temps Modernes
- Past members: Nick Currie; Malcolm Ross; Dave Weddell; Paul Mason; Ronnie Torrance; Neil Martin

The Happy Family were an early-1980s post punk band from Scotland, featuring Momus and members of Josef K.

== History ==
The band was initially formed in 1981 by Nick Currie (vocals, guitar), who had dropped out of college to form the band, Malcolm Ross (guitar), Dave Weddell (bass) of Josef K and Paul Mason. After a debut EP on 4AD Records in March 1982, they expanded to a 5-piece with the recruitment of former Josef K and Boots For Dancing drummer Ronnie Torrance, keyboard player Neill Martin. The band's debut album, The Man on Your Street was issued on 4AD in November 1982 (later reissued on CD in 1992 with the EP tracks added). The band split in 1983, Currie frustrated by the indifference of 4AD towards them (although he later cited poor sales as the reason), with Currie embarking on a solo career. Some demos the band had recorded were released on a cassette album entitled This Business of Living in 1984 on the Les Temps Modernes label (later known as LTM).

== Discography ==
=== Singles ===
- Puritans EP (1982) 4AD

=== Albums ===
- The Man on Your Street (1982) 4AD
- This Business of Living (1984) Les Temps Modernes
