= Hippopotamomus =

Studio album by Momus
- Released: 12 August 1991
- Recorded: March–April 1991
- Studios: The Spike (Fulham, London)
- Label: Creation
- Producer: Momus

Momus chronology
Don't Stop the Night (1989)	Hippopotamomus (1991)	The Ultraconformist (1992)

Professional ratings
Review scores
Source	Rating
AllMusic	4.5/5 stars
NME	0/10
Select	4/5

Hippopotamomus is the fifth studio album by British musician Momus, released in 1991 through Creation Records.

The album's third track, "Michelin Man", caused Momus to be threatened with legal action by the Michelin tyre company. They were angered by his use of their mascot, the aforementioned Michelin Man, an anthropomorphic pile of rubber inner-tubes, as a metaphor for hypersexual rubber fetishism. As a result, all unsold copies of the album were destroyed and future pressings of the album omitted the song from the album. The track was later reinstated on the Create 2 compilation as part of a 2018 reissue campaign with Cherry Red Records.

== Reception ==
The album received mixed reviews from critics. Melody Maker's Sharon O'Connell compared the album to the work of Serge Gainsbourg, speculating that the title referenced Gainsbourg's scatological, wordplay-heavy song "L'Hippopodame". Select's Ted Kessler gave the album a positive review, calling it "wickedly seductive". Critics generally noted the album's overwhelmingly sexual themes.

NME's Betty Page panned the album, giving it a rating of 0/10, labelling Momus a "perv" and "anal retentive", and taking issue with the album's themes of cannibalism, violence against women, pornography, paedophilia, and extreme sexual practices. The controversy stemming from Page's review would later serve as the basis for Amongst Women Only, a 1991 documentary directed by Nicholas Triandafyllidis centred on Momus's relations with women and accusations of misogyny raised against him.

== Track listing ==
All tracks are written by Nicholas Currie (Momus).

No.	Title	Length
1.	"Hippopotamomus"	4:23
2.	"I Ate a Girl Right Up"	3:16
3.	"Michelin Man" (also known as "Made of Rubber")	1:54
4.	"A Dull Documentary"	3:12
5.	"Marquis of Sadness"	3:31
6.	"Bluestocking"	3:11
7.	"Ventriloquists and Dolls"	3:55
8.	"The Painter and His Model"	4:29
9.	"A Monkey for Sallie"	2:44
10.	"Pornography"	3:04
11.	"Song in Contravention"	4:36
