= K.K.K.K.K. =

Studio album by Kahimi Karie
- Released: July 15, 1998
- Genre: Shibuya-kei; synth-pop
- Length: 41:38
- Label: Crue-L; Polydor
- Producer: Kahimi Karie; Hirohisa Horie; Momus; Stereo Total; Philippe Katerine; Tomoki Kanda; Kenji Takimi

Kahimi Karie chronology
Larme de Crocodile (1997)	K.K.K.K.K. (1998)	Kahimi Karie (1998)

Singles from K.K.K.K.K.
- 1. "One Thousand 20th Century Chairs" Released: June 29, 1998

Professional ratings
Review scores
Source	Rating
AllMusic	4/5 stars
Alternative Press	4/5
Pitchfork	4.0/10
Rolling Stone	3/5 stars
Spin	7/10

K.K.K.K.K. is the second studio album by Japanese musician Kahimi Karie. It was released on July 15, 1998 by Crue-L Records and Polydor Records. In the United States, K.K.K.K.K. was issued on October 26, 1999 by Le Grand Magistery, following Kahimi Karie (1998) as Karie's second American album release.

Like most Kahimi Karie albums, the songs are predominantly sung in English, though several are written in French. A song with lyrics by Karie herself is also included ("What Is Blue?"), rare in her early work.

== Track listing ==
No.	Title	Lyrics	Music	Length
1.	"One Thousand 20th Century Chairs"	Momus	Hirohisa Horie	2:23
2.	"What Are You Wearing?"	Momus	Momus	5:36
3.	"Qu'est-ce que tu veux?"	Françoise Cactus	Cactus	2:30
4.	"Clip Clap"	Cactus	Friedrich von Finsterwalde	2:48
5.	"Kahimi Karie et moi"	Philippe Katerine	Katerine	2:43
6.	"Harmony Korine"	Momus	Tomoki Kanda	4:44
7.	"The Harder They Come"	Jimmy Cliff	Cliff	4:26
8.	"The Symphonies of Beethoven"	Momus	Momus	4:47
9.	"Orly-Narita"	Katerine	Kanda	5:10
10.	"What Is Blue?"	Kahimi Karie	Horie	3:56
11.	"Kahimi au téléphone"	Cactus	Cactus	2:35
Total length:				41:38

Japanese LP edition bonus tracks
No.	Title	Lyrics	Music	Length
12.	"The Harder They Come" (Crue-L Entertainment mix)	Cliff	Cliff	4:55
13.	"The Harder They Come" (Crue-L Entertainment mix instrumental)	Cliff	Cliff	4:55
14.	"Harmony Korine" (dub)	Momus	Kanda	6:23
15.	"Harmony Korine" (dub instrumental)	Momus	Kanda	6:23
Total length:				64:14

US edition bonus tracks
No.	Title	Lyrics	Music	Length
12.	"What Are You Wearing?" (Shinco remix)	Momus	Momus	4:25
13.	"The Symphonies of Beethoven" (Add N to (X) remix)	Momus	Momus	5:51
14.	"Orly-Narita" (Buffalo Daughter remix)	Katerine	Kanda	5:52
15.	"One Thousand 20th Century Chairs" (Hirohisa Horie remix)	Momus	Horie	3:50
Total length:				61:36

== Charts ==
Chart (1998)	Peak position
Japanese Albums (Oricon)	30
