= Vivid (Momus album) =

Studio album by Momus
- Released: 14 July 2020
- Length: 1:01:17
- Label: American Patchwork (AMPATCH027)

Momus chronology
Akkordion (2019)	Vivid (2020)	Athenian (2021)

Vivid is a 2020 album by Scottish musician Momus. It was released on 14 July 2020 through independent label American Patchwork and distributed on CD by Darla Records.

== Background ==
Vivid was recorded in self-isolation at Momus' home in Berlin during the beginning of the COVID-19 pandemic. Momus, who himself was suffering from a suspected case of the virus, charted his own recovery through his songwriting, stating in a BBC interview that he "was very scared", adding that he "started anticipating all the RIP Momus messages people would be posting." After seven days spent in bed recovering from illness, he wrote the first 11 tracks within the span of 23 days, releasing them through YouTube. Momus noted that the album's title referenced the "very vivid experience" of experiencing the illness and reflecting on his own mortality.

== Reception ==
Dave DiMartino of Yahoo Entertainment ranked Vivid his favourite album of 2020, calling it one of Momus' "best albums ever". Independent music outlet Treblezine included the album in its list of "18 Great Albums from 2020 You Might Have Missed", calling the album "a striking snapshot of this horrible moment". Alexis Petridis, head pop and rock critic for The Guardian, called Vivid "as incisive, angry and darkly funny a portrait of life in lockdown as has yet been produced." Clive Lindsay, journalist for BBC Scotland, published an extensive article and interview with Momus during the album's production.

== Track listing ==
All tracks are written by Momus, except track 9, written by Tom Lehrer.

No.	Title	Length
1.	"Oblivion"	4:45
2.	"Working From Home"	4:57
3.	"Ten Foot Hut"	3:04
4.	"September"	4:36
5.	"Parasite"	3:52
6.	"Self-Isolation"	3:11
7.	"Empty Paris"	4:23
8.	"Movement"	4:23
9.	"I Got It From Agnes"	3:04
10.	"My Corona"	4:08
11.	"Long Distance Love"	4:05
12.	"Spring"	4:11
13.	"Levitation"	3:53
14.	"Fever Dream"	3:49
15.	"Optimism"	4:56
Total length:		1:01:17
