= Super Madrigal Brothers =

- Genre: Experimental music
- Members: Oliver Cobol; Fashion Flesh
- Website: supermadrigalbros.com

Super Madrigal Brothers is a video game music duo consisting of Oliver Cobol (born Adam Bruneu) and Fashion Flesh (born John Talaga).

== History ==
Super Madrigal Brothers' first release was Shakestation in 2002, an album which consisted of music by Renaissance and Baroque composers played with altered video game consoles and electronic instruments. After the release of the album, the group toured in 2002 with Momus, who had initially introduced the artists. The group's version of "Pastime with Good Company" was included on a 2003 Darla Records compilation, Little Darla Has a Treat for You, Vol. 19, which PopMatters described as "a song sure to evoke gamer geek nostalgia". Talaga produced Momus's 2003 Oskar Tennis Champion, which contains a hidden track by Cobol, "The Ringtone Cycle", and Momus's 2005 Otto Spooky. Their 2005 release, Baroque in Voltage, deals mostly with Baroque music except for their version of the finale of Georges Bizet's Carmen.

== Discography ==
- Shakestation (American Patchwork, 2002)
- Baroque in Voltage (Fever Pitch Records, 2005)
