= Oskar Tennis Champion =

Studio album by Momus
- Released: March 2003
- Genre: Pop/rock
- Length: 63:10
- Label: American Patchwork
- Producer: John Talaga

Momus chronology
Folktronic (2001)	Oskar Tennis Champion (2003)	Summerisle (2004)

Professional ratings
Aggregate scores
Source	Rating
Metacritic	62/100
Review scores
Source	Rating
AllMusic	3/5 stars
Pitchfork	2.1 stars on a 10 point scale

Oskar Tennis Champion (Cherry Red #ANALOG 008CD) is a 2003 album by Momus. He described its style as "cabaret concrete": a mix of, "offbeat storytelling," and, "fragmented...computerized beats," referring to his love of singer songwriters such as Jacques Brel and Serge Gainsbourg mixed with his love of musique concrète. A bonus disc, Oscar Originals, contains "PREMIX" track versions and three extras.

== Track listing ==
1. "Spooky Kabuki"
2. "Is It Because I'm a Pirate?"
3. "Multiplying Love"
4. "Scottish Lips"
5. "My Sperm Is Not Your Enemy"
6. "Oskar Tennis Champion"
7. "A Little Schubert"
8. "The Laird of Inversnecky"
9. "The Last Communist"
10. "Pierrot Lunaire"
11. "Beowulf (I Am Deformed)"
12. "Electrosexual Sewing Machine"
13. "A Lapdog"
14. "Lovely Tree"
15. "Palm Deathtop"
16. untitled (a minute of silence)
17. untitled (The Ringtone Cycle by Oliver Cobol)

Extra tracks on Oscar Originals:

16. "Back Answers PREMIX" (lyrics by Robb Wilton)
17. "Erostratus PREMIX"
18. "Infanticide PREMIX"
