= Tilt (Kahimi Karie album) =

Studio album by Kahimi Karie
- Released: May 24, 2000
- Genre: Shibuya-kei
- Length: 56:09
- Label: Polydor
- Producers: Kahimi Karie; Momus; Steven Claydon; The Olivia Tremor Control; Barry 7

Kahimi Karie chronology
Kahimi Karie (1998)	Tilt (2000)	KK Works 1998–2000 (2001)

Professional ratings
Review scores
Source	Rating
AllMusic	1.5/5 stars

Tilt is the third studio album by Japanese musician Kahimi Karie. It was released on May 24, 2000, by Polydor Records.

Tilt features collaborations with Add N to (X), Arto Lindsay, Momus, The Olivia Tremor Control and Tahiti 80, among other artists. Three of the album's tracks were released earlier in 2000 on EPs by Karie: "Do You Know the Time?" and "Metaphors" on Once Upon a Time, and "Pygmalism" on Journey to the Centre of Me.

== Track listing ==
No.	Title	Lyrics	Music	Length
1.	"I Can't Wait for Summer"	Kahimi Karie	Tomoki Kanda	4:16
2.	"Je dormais sous la neige"	Julien Ribot	Ribot	5:06
3.	"Sleepwalking"	Arto Lindsay	Melvin Gibbs	3:10
4.	"Pygmalism"	Momus	Momus	6:00
5.	"Ice Age Train"	Steven Claydon	Claydon	4:39
6.	"Dear Boy"	Lindsay	Vinicius Cantuária	3:32
7.	"Do You Know the Time?"	William Hart	Hart	3:12
8.	"Metaphors"	Hart	Hart	2:42
9.	"?"	Ribot	Ribot	3:40
10.	"(We'll Go) Separate Ways"	Xavier Boyer; Médéric Gontier; Sylvain Marchand	Boyer; Pedro Resende	3:34
11.	"Kemuri" (けむり)	Karie	Kanda	5:02
12.	"Happy Birthday What Am I For?"	Karie; Barry 7	Barry 7	9:15
13.	"Lila's Theme"	Richard M. Sherman; Robert B. Sherman	R. M. Sherman; R. B. Sherman	2:01
Total length:				56:09

== Charts ==
Chart (2000)	Peak position
Japanese Albums (Oricon)	46
