= Momus (musician) =

Scottish songwriter and author (born 1960)

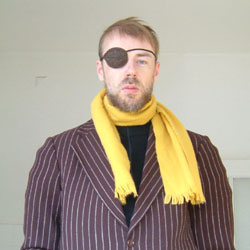
- Currie in 2005
- Born: Nicholas John Currie; 11 February 1960 (age 66); Paisley, Renfrewshire, Scotland
- Other name: Momus
- Occupations: Songwriter; author; journalist
- Years active: 1981–present
- Musical career
- Genres: Indie pop; avant-pop; electronic
- Labels: él; Creation; Richmond; Cherry Red; Analog Baroque
- Website: imomus.com

Nicholas John Currie (born 11 February 1960), more popularly known under the artist name Momus (after the Greek god of mockery), is a Scottish musician and writer.

For over forty years he has been releasing albums on labels in the United Kingdom, the United States, and Japan. In his lyrics and his other writing he makes use of continental philosophy, and has built up a personal world he says is "dominated by values like diversity, orientalism, and a respect for otherness".

== Career ==
=== Musical ===
Currie's musical career began in 1981, with his band The Happy Family, featuring ex-members of Josef K, who made a single and a concept album The Man on Your Street: Songs of the Dictator Hall on hip UK indie label 4AD.

In 1986 Momus recorded an E.P. of his translations of Jacques Brel songs, "Nicky", and wrote a lengthy article on Brel for the New Statesman. On 22 October 2009 he performed at the Barbican alongside fellow Brel enthusiasts Marc Almond and Camille O'Sullivan at a celebration of Brel's career Carousel: The Songs of Jacques Brel.

His album Don't Stop The Night included the single "The Hairstyle of the Devil", which peaked at No. 94 in the UK Singles Chart in May 1989, and was also a local hit at San Francisco's KITS Live 105 radio station.

Momus' 1980s albums were a great influence on Jarvis Cocker, who wrote to Currie asking him to produce future Pulp albums. Those same albums were a huge influence on Brett Anderson; Currie's championing of Suede following his friendship with Anderson, and particularly rhythm guitar player Justine Frischmann, got them early attention. Momus features in Bad Vibes, the memoir of musician Luke Haines, whom Currie dubbed "The Hitler of Britpop."

In the early 1990s, Momus struck up a working relationship with a number of J-Pop stars. A cult audience for Momus and the indie labels he had released his early records on, particularly el records, led to the formation community of musicians in Shibuya, Tokyo, and the founding of Cru-el records, and the emergence of Shibuya-kei artists such as Cornelius and The Poison Girlfriend, the latter named for his second album The Poison Boyfriend, who performed Momus songs. Currie began writing specifically for nOrikO (aka the Poison Girlfriend) and Kahimi Karie. In 1995 Kahimi Karie's Momus-penned song "Good Morning World" went to number one and was featured in a heavily syndicated advert, giving Currie his first real hit and financial stability for the first time.

Momus has continued to release music regularly. His 2020 album, Vivid, which documented the COVID-19 pandemic and Momus' own suspected case of the virus, earned some coverage in the mainstream media.

He has been the subject of a number of documentaries including Hannu Puttonen's Man of Letters.

=== As author ===
Currie has published a book of lyrics, and has written texts or introductions for several books on art and culture. Under the names Momums, he has published six novels. The Book of Jokes and The Book of Scotlands received positive reviews in the LA Times and the Guardian. The Book of Scotlands (Sternberg Press) was shortlisted for the Scottish Arts Council's First Book prize. He published The Book of Japans in 2011, also on Sternberg Press, and UnAmerica in 2014, as well as several ebooks.

2020 saw the publication of Niche: a memoir in pastiche in which Currie tells the story of his creative life through fictional eyewitness statements from famous historic figures.

=== Blog and vlog ===
Momus said in 1991 that "In the future everyone will be famous for fifteen people", which has evolved into a meme: "On the web, everyone will be famous to fifteen people". The quip parodies Andy Warhol's famous prediction that, "In the future, everyone will be famous for fifteen minutes".

From 15 January 2004 to 10 February 2010, Momus wrote a blog on the LiveJournal platform called Click Opera. Initially a collection of links, Click Opera evolved to become a substantial daily cultural essay. After announcing it unexpectedly in an interview with magazine called Chronic'art, Momus ended the blog on his fiftieth birthday because it had become too time-consuming and because LiveJournal was being wound down. It is cited a high point of the blogging era and led to Momus becoming a columnist with the New York Times and Wired.

Since 2016, Momus has been releasing a series of improvised lectures and travel vlogs called Open University.

== Lawsuits ==
In 1991, following the release of the album Hippopotamomus, Momus was threatened with legal action by the Michelin tyre company for his song "Michelin Man" which imagined the company's Bibendum mascot as a metaphor for hypersexual rubber fetishism. Remaining copies of the album were destroyed, the track was withdrawn from subsequent pressings of the album, and the album's cover was amended to remove a hippo-headed pastiche of the Michelin Man character. The lyrics to the track were included in the lyric book Lusts of a Moron under the amended title "Made of Rubber". The 2018 box set Recreate restored both the track and title, with the accompanying booklet by Anthony Reynolds Sons of Pioneers, detailing the legal wrangle but not explaining the track's reinstatement.

In 1998, Momus was sued by the composer/musician Wendy Carlos for $22 million for his song "Walter Carlos" (from the album The Little Red Songbook, released that year), which postulated that the post-gender transition Wendy could travel back in time to marry her pre-surgery self. The case was settled out of court, with Momus agreeing to remove the song from subsequent editions of the CD and owing $30,000 in legal fees. Momus' following album Stars Forever consisted of commissioned biographical sketches in the style of the Wendy Carlos song, conceived as a crowdfunding exercise to pay Currie's legal fees.

== Personal life ==
Currie attended boarding school at the Edinburgh Academy while his father taught English for the British Council in Athens.

Since 1984 Momus has lived in London, Paris, Tokyo, New York, Berlin and Osaka. He currently splits his time between Berlin and Paris. He is an atheist.

In 1994, at the age of 34, he married his 17-year-old girlfriend. She was 14 when they first corresponded by fan mail and met in-person months later. They separated in 1997 and divorced in 1999.

In December 1997, he contracted acanthamoeba keratitis in his right eye due to a contact lens mishap sustained while on holiday in Greece, causing loss of vision on that side. Although his sight subsequently improved following surgery, he has suffered lingering effects from the infection since, causing him to often be photographed in an eyepatch, wearing dark glasses, or squinting.

His cousin is musician Justin Currie, the lead singer and songwriter of Del Amitri. His brother-in-law is Irvine Welsh, author of Trainspotting, following Welsh's marriage to his sister, actress Emma Currie, in 2022.

== Bibliography ==
Author name	Title	Publisher	Year	Format	Genre/subject
Momus	Lusts of a Moron	Black Swan Press	1992	pb	lyrics
Nicholas Currie	Pierre et Gilles	Taschen	1993	pb	art/photography (French, English & German)
Nicholas Currie	Fotolog.Book	Thames & Hudson	2006	hb	photoblogging
Momus	Matt Stokes: Lost in the Rhythm	Art Editions North	2007	pb	art - essay
Momus	The Book of Scotlands (Solution 11-167)	Sternberg Press	2009	pb	novel
Momus	The Book of Scotlands (Solution 11-167)	Luath Press	2018	pb	second edition
Momus	The Book of Jokes	Dalkey Press	2009	pb	novel
Momus	(Le Livre des Blagues)	La Volte	2009	pb	novel (French)
Momus	(El libro de las bromas)	Ediciones Alpha Decay	2012	pb	novel (Spanish)
Momus	The Book of Japan's (Solution 214–239)	Sternberg Press	2011	pb	novel
Momus	Unamerica (Success and Failure)	Penny-Ante Editions	2014	pb	novel
Momus		Le Serpent à Plumes	2015	pb	(in French)
Momus	Zizek's Jokes	MIT Press	2014	hb	cultural studies - afterword
Momus	Zizek's Jokes	MIT Press	2018	pb	
Momus	Herr F	Fiktion	2015	ebook	novel (German and English)
Momus	Herr F	edition taberna kritika	2019	pb	novel (in German)
Momus	Black Letts Diary	iMomus	2016	ebook	diaries
Momus	Popppappp	Fiktion	2016	ebook	novel
Momus	Somewhere There are People Like Me	iMomus	2016	ebook	diaries
Momus	Off the Beaten Track: A Year in Haiku	Boatwhistle Press	2016	pb	poetry - contributor
Momus	The Bertie Wooster of Alienation	iMomus	2017	ebook	diaries
Momus	Niche: a memoir in pastiche	Farrar, Straus & Giroux	2020	hb	autobiography
John Robinson	Famous for Fifteen People: The Songs of Momus 1982–1995	Zero Books	2021	pb and ebook	biography and critical analysis
John Robinson	Folktronics: The Songs of Momus 1996–2008	P&H Books	February 2024	pb and ebook	biography and critical analysis

== Discography ==
=== Studio albums ===
- Circus Maximus (1986)
- The Poison Boyfriend (1987)
- Tender Pervert (1988)
- Don't Stop the Night (1989)
- Hippopotamomus (1991)
- The Ultraconformist (Live Whilst Out of Fashion) (1992)
- Voyager (1992)
- Timelord (1993)
- The Philosophy of Momus (1995)
- Slender Sherbet - Classic Songs Revisited (1995)
- Ping Pong (1997)
- The Little Red Songbook (1998)
- Stars Forever (1999)
- Folktronic (2001)
- Oskar Tennis Champion (2003)
- Summerisle, a collaboration with Anne Laplantine (2004)
- Otto Spooky (2005)
- Ocky Milk (2006)
- Joemus, a collaboration with Joe Howe (2008)
- Hypnoprism (2010)
- Thunderclown, a collaboration with John Henriksson (2011)
- Bibliotek (2012)
- In Samoa (2012)
- Sunbutler, a collaboration with Joe Howe (2012)
- MOMUSMCCLYMONT, a collaboration with David McClymont (2013)
- Bambi (2013)
- MOMUSMCCLYMONT II, a collaboration with David McClymont (2014)
- Turpsycore (2015)
- Glyptothek (2015)
- Scobberlotchers (2016)
- Pillycock (2017)
- Pantaloon (2018)
- Akkordion (2019)
- Vivid (2020)
- Athenian (2021)
- Smudger (2022)
- Issyvoo (2022)
- Krambambuli (2023)
- Yikes! (2024)
- Ballyhoo (2024)
- Quietism (2025)
- Acktor (2025)
- Mannequin (2026)
- Humperstinck (2026)

=== Compilations ===
- Monsters of Love (1990)
- Learning to Be Human (1994)
- Twenty Vodka Jellies (1996)
- Stop This (1998)
- Forbidden Software Timemachine (2003)
- Pubic Intellectual: An Anthology 1986–2016 (three CD box set) (2016)
- Procreate (three CD box set) (2017)
- Recreate (three CD box set) (2018)
- 20 Frisky Whiskies (2024)

=== Singles and EPs ===
- The Beast With 3 Backs (1985)
- Murderers, The Hope of Women (1986)
- Nicky (1986)
- The Hairstyle of the Devil UK #94 (1989)
- Spacewalk (1992)
- The Sadness of Things (1995)
- The Thunderclown (2011)
- The Synthy EP (2021)

=== Demos ===
- Amazing Blonde Women
- Clicky McOnomy
- Early 90s Demos Tape #1
- Early 90s Demos Tape #2
- Germs of Gems
- The Golden Age of Television
- Innermost Thoughts
- Oskar Originals
- Samizdat
- Sawdust & Shavings
- Scotch Classic
