= Kahimi Karie =

- Born: Mari Hiki (比企 真理); March 15, 1968 (age 58)
- Genres: Shibuya-kei, pop, rock, folk, jazz, experimental
- Years active: 1990–2010
- Labels: Victor; Polydor; Crue-L; Trattoria

Mari Hiki (比企 真理, Hiki Mari; born March 15, 1968), better known by her stage name Kahimi Karie (カヒミ・カリィ, Kahimi Karii), is a retired Japanese singer, songwriter and photographer. Her music is closely associated with the Shibuya-kei aesthetic. Karie sings in English, French and Japanese, among other languages.

Karie began her music career in 1990 at the encouragement of fellow Shibuya-kei artist Cornelius, whom she collaborated with on many of her early works, and whose trendy Trattoria label released many of her EPs in the mid-1990s. Karie later moved to Paris and released several studio albums on the Crue-L and Polydor labels. She now lives in New York City.

== Career ==
Kahimi Karie was born Mari Hiki on March 15, 1968. Her mother died early in Kahimi's childhood. Kahimi was thereafter raised by her father, a prominent doctor in Utsunomiya.

Karie moved to Tokyo after graduating high school and entered a vocational college to study photography. After graduating college, she made a short career as a freelance photographer. In the late 1980s, Karie became an avid listener of French musicians such as Serge Gainsbourg, Françoise Hardy, and Jane Birkin, who would serve as formative influences on her own music. In 1990, at the suggestion of her then-boyfriend Keigo Oyamada (later known as Cornelius), Karie began her musical career performing vocals for a house band signed to his friend's record label. She later performed vocals alongside Takako Minekawa as the duo Fancy Face Groovy Name. In 1992, Karie issued her first solo single, "Mike Alway's Diary", which was produced by Oyamada. At this time she was referred to as "Shibuya-kei Princess", and her personal relationship with Oyamada was highly publicized.

Karie later moved to Paris to pursue her career further. During this period she recorded the albums Larme de Crocodile (1997), K.K.K.K.K. (1998) and Tilt (2000) for Crue-L Records and Polydor Records, working with a variety of collaborators, including Momus and Philippe Katerine.

In 2003, Karie released her fourth studio album Trapeziste on her new record label Victor Entertainment. The album found Karie pursuing a more experimental musical direction. She has released three subsequent albums for Victor: Montage (2004), Nunki (2006) and It's Here (2010).

Her song Blue Orb appears in the 2005 video game We Love Katamari

== Personal life ==
Karie is married to tap dancer Kazunori Kumagai, with whom she has one daughter. She currently lives in New York City.

== Discography ==
- Larme de Crocodile (1997)
- K.K.K.K.K. (1998)
- Tilt (2000)
- Trapeziste (2003)
- Montage (2004)
- Nunki (2006)
- It's Here (2010)

== Books ==
- I'm Gonna Tear My Playhouse Down! (February 5, 2002)
- Kahimi Karie + Marquee (April 22, 2005)
- 小鳥がうたう、私もうたう。静かな空に響くから (March 2, 2012)
- にきたま (December 13, 2018)
