= Jean-Yves Calvez =

French academic (1927–2010)

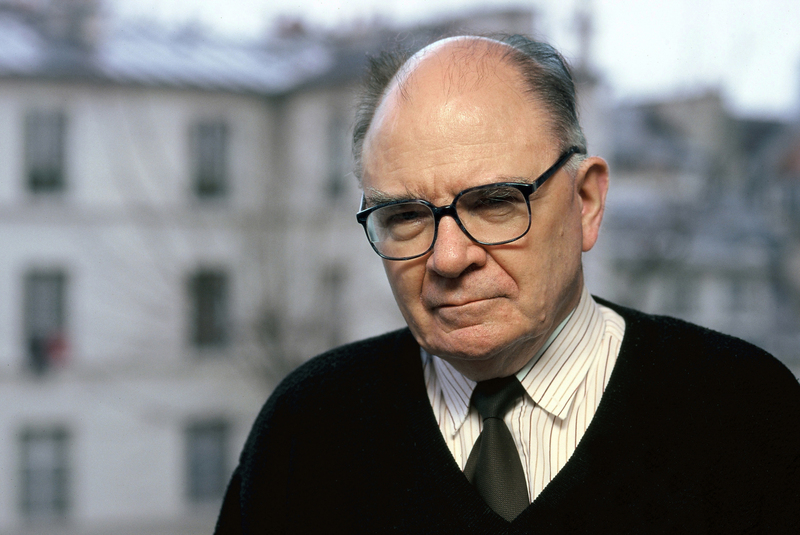
Jean-Yves Calvez

Jean-Yves Calvez (3 February 1927 – 11 January 2010) was a French Jesuit, theologian, philosopher, economist, expert in Marxism and professor of social philosophy.

== Biography ==
=== Youth and training ===
At age 16, Calvez became a novitiate of the Society of Jesus on October 23, 1943. Following his religious training he completed brilliant studies at the institute of political science and the institute of international law in Paris. He also earned a degree from the School for Advanced Studies in the Social Sciences. From 1953, he taught social sciences at the Jesuit academy of Chantilly. On July 31, 1957, he was ordained as a Catholic priest.

=== Social philosophy ===
Jean-Yves Calvez was not yet a priest in 1956 when he published a work that rapidly gained attention in the field of social philosophy: The Thought of Karl Marx (La Pensée de Karl Marx). To be interested in Marxism before the Second Vatican Council and to reveal a certain sympathy for Karl Marx was daring. However, the objectivity and depth of his work, avoiding the polemic and Communist party thinking that often attached themselves to Marx's personality, immediately gained him great esteem in the field of social philosophy. The Thought of Karl Marx has been published in many editions and is still a reference book today.

A polyglot, Calvez was very interested in social, economic, and political questions, refusing to separate these three fields of study, but rather tying them together in research serving a Christian vision of the whole human being. Such was his engagement as a Jesuit priest in the Catholic Church. Calvez studied and promoted a Catholic social teaching that was less Euro-centric and more oriented toward the grave problems of underdevelopment that accompanied the wave of botched decolonizations of the 1960s.

Calvez was a teacher of philosophy and social sciences in the Jesuit faculty of philosophy in Chantilly, and he was the director of the center of "popular action" (later known as the Center for Social Research and Action, CERAS). He participated in 1962 in the foundation of a socio-economic research center, the African Institute for Economic and Social Development (INADES), later known as the Center for Research and Action for Peace, in Abidjan. He traveled a lot, particularly in Latin America, where he was close to liberation theologists with whom he would maintain strong links of esteem and friendship for the rest of his life.

=== Provincial Superior and General Assistant ===
In 1967, Calvez was named provincial superior and tasked with uniting the four Jesuit provinces of France. After finishing this work, he was called to Rome in 1971 by the Superior general of the Society of Jesus, Pedro Arrupe, as an assistant. He was a trusted advisor there. Calvez actively participated in preparation for the 32nd General Congregation of the Jesuits (1974-1975) which, in a still-famous decree, gave the Society a mission to focus on "the service of faith and the promotion of justice." Calvez was elected General Assistant to Arrupe (that is, one of his four closest advisors).

As a deputy to Arrupe, Calvez worked hard to implement in the life and works of the Society the spirit of this new "faith-and-justice" paradigm. Difficulties and misunderstandings were large, and conflicts were not lacking. Until Arrupe was stricken by a blood clot forcing him to step down from his leadership of the Society, Calvez worked with Paolo Dezza, pontifical delegate named by Pope John Paul II, and together they prepared the Society for the 33rd General Congregation that would elect the new Superior General, Peter Hans Kolvenbach.

=== Return to France ===
Back in France, Father Calvez was the director of the Center for Social Research and Action (CERAS) from 1984 to 1989, and editor-in-chief of the magazine Études from 1989 to 1995. He helped with the revival of "social weeks" in France as a member of the association's administrative council from 1985 to 2000.

During these years he continued to write on economic, social, and political questions and on Catholic social teaching, especially in the magazine Projet (published by CERAS), of which he was the director for many years.

Calvez also presented in front of many audiences. He taught in the department of social ethics at the Jesuit faculty of Sèvres-Paris from 2002 to 2006, and, at the invitation of Cardinal Jean-Marie Lustiger, gave a series of sermons in the Cathedral of Notre Dame de Paris. Georgetown University in Washington, D.C., made him a member of its administrative council. Every year, Calvez went to Argentina for summer classes.

Calvez died in Paris on January 11, 2010, of complications from a pulmonary edema.

== Works ==
In addition to numerous articles on social, economic, and political questions, Jean-Yves Calvez is the author of the following books:

- La Pensée de Karl Marx, Paris, 1956.
- Église et société économique (2 volumes), Paris, 1959-1962.
- Introduction à la vie politique, Paris, 1967.
- Aspects des pays en voie de développement, Paris, 1970.
- Le père Arrupe; l’Église après le Concile, Le Cerf, Paris, 1997 ISBN 978-2204055932.
- Les Silences de la doctrine sociale catholique, Atelier, Paris, 1999 ISBN 978-2708234321.
- Comprendre le catholicisme (avec Philippe Lécrivain), Eyrolles, 2008
- Traversées jésuites, Cerf, 2009
