= Norbert de Boynes =

Norbert de Boynes (August 24, 1870 in La Trinité-des-Laitiers, Dep. Orne – October 6, 1954 in Rome), was Vicar General of the Society Of Jesus from the death of Vicar General Alessio Magni (12 April 1944) until the election of Jean-Baptiste Janssens at General Congregation XXIX in September 1946.

De Boynes joined the Jesuit order in 1888; he was the assistant to the Father General from 1923–44 and then became vicar general of the Society and led the order until 1946 when Fr. Janssens was elected general.

== Early career ==
In 1924 de Boynes carried out an investigation into a paper which interpreted the doctrine of original sin in the light of modern science; he completed the investigation and concluded that it had been written by Pierre Teilhard de Chardin, but Teilhard regretted the publishing of the paper.

De Boynes was assigned Visitor of the Province of Maryland-New York and stayed for two years in 1920-22.

During WWII, Boynes was against the idea of French resistance.

== Leadership of the Society of Jesus ==
Father General Wlodimir Ledóchowski had followed the tradition of leaving a letter naming a vicar general to govern the Society until a general congregation could be convoked. On the night after the general's death it was read to the staff of the Curia assembled in the chapel. To their consternation they learned that he had not chosen Father Schurmans whom he had made vicar general four years previously but Alessio Magni, the Italian Assistant. Father Magni was almost as old as Father Ledóchowski himself and he was to govern the Society for only 16 months. It is to him, however, that Jesuits owe the decree creating the present New York Province on the Feast of the Sacred Heart in 1943. Father Magni died on April 12, 1944, two months before the liberation of Rome.

As per Jesuit rules in such circumstances, the seniormost professed fathers present in Rome had to gather and elect a new Vicar General. They chose Norbert de Boynes, the French Assistant. Although Father de Boynes during the previous thirty years had held many responsible offices (e.g. Visitor of the North American provinces as well as the missions in Nanking and the Near East and substitute for the ailing General during General Congregation XXVII), he had recently come close to provoking a schism in the French Provinces. In August 1941 he had as Assistant instructed the French Jesuits that Marshal Pétain's government was the only legitimate government of France. Father de Boynes made this assertion a mere eight months after Vichy had issued its own Jewish statutes. Whatever Father de Boynes' other claims on consideration for the office, his election is viewed by some as an uncomfortable revelation of the conservative bias still existing in the Roman houses.
