= Admonitor =

Jesuit term

In the Society of Jesus, an Admonitor is an advisor to the Superior General whose responsibility is to warn (or admonish) the General honestly and confidentially about "what in him he thinks would be for the greater service and glory of God" [Const. N°770]. That means in any matter, whether in regard to his own person (health, spiritual life, etc.) or to his governance (exercise of authority, personal obedience, etc.). An admonitor is a Jesuit member responsible for communicating to a superior on any number of issues — observations, complaints, requests often of a delicate nature on behalf of his fellow-Jesuits. The position was established with a view to assisting the superior and the community as a whole, in terms of the quality of its leadership by identifying areas of disagreement, misconduct, or other problems that might arise.

The Admonitor of the Superior General is appointed (elected) by the same General Congregation that elects the Superior General, as an expression of the "provident care which the Society exercises in regard to the Superior General" [Const. N°766]. He should be a man "familiar with God, of sound and mature judgment, well versed in the matters of the Society of Jesus, discreet and prudent, not credulous or timid" [Norms, N°379]. A Regional Assistant is usually given this extra office.

In the Society of Jesus, besides the Superior General, all those who have authority - Provincials, Rectors and Superiors - are given an 'Admonitor' (appointed by the immediate higher superior) who mutatis mutandis has a similar responsibility.

== List of Admonitors ==
- Giovanni Stefano Menochio (1575–1655), admonitor to the Superiors General Vincenzo Caraffa and Francisco Piccolomini
- James E. Grummer, admonitor to Superior General Adolfo Nicolás
- Anye John the Baptist SJ. He is a Socius, Admonitor and Consultor to the President of the Conference of Africa and Madagascar. He is also the assistant for formation at Jesuit Conference of Africa and Madagacsar (JCAM) and Major Superior of the St. Ignatius Community in Karen. He is a member of the West Africa Jesuit Province.
