= Jesuit Refugee Service =

Rome-based international aid organization

Coordinates: 41°54′4.94″N 12°27′38″E

- Abbreviation: JRS
- Formation: 14 November 1980; 45 years ago
- Founder: Fr Pedro Arrupe SJ
- Headquarters: Rome
- Region served: over 50 countries worldwide
- Affiliations: Society of Jesus
- Website: jrs.net

The Jesuit Refugee Service (JRS) is an international Catholic organisation with a mission to accompany, serve, and advocate on behalf of refugees and other forcibly displaced persons, that they may heal, learn, and determine their own future. Founded in November 1980 as a work of the Society of Jesus, JRS was officially registered on 19 March 2000 in Vatican City as a foundation. The impetus to found JRS came from the then superior general of the Jesuits, Pedro Arrupe, who was inspired to action by the plight of Vietnamese boat people. JRS has programmes in over 55 countries. The areas of work are in the field of education, emergency assistance, health care, livelihoods, reconciliation, and psychosocial support. JRS is also involved in advocacy and human rights work. This involves ensuring that refugees are afforded their full rights as guaranteed by the 1951 Geneva Convention relating to the Status of Refugees and working to strengthen the protection afforded to Internally displaced persons (IDPs). JRS's international headquarters is located in Rome at the Society's General Curia. The International Director is Br Michael Schöpf SJ.

== History ==
JRS was founded in November 1980 by Fr. Pedro Arrupe SJ, the then superior general of the Society of Jesus, to respond to the plight of Vietnamese boat people fleeing their war-ravaged homeland.

Following the end of the Vietnam War in 1975, hundreds of thousands of South Vietnamese fled their homes, setting out in overcrowded boats across the South China Sea. Many did not survive the journey; they were killed by pirates, or drowned because of storms and rough seas. Arrupe wrote to over 50 Jesuit provinces, calling on them "to bring at least some relief to such a tragic situation." This led, in November 1980, to the establishment of the JRS, which eventually expanded to work on refugee services across the globe.

Nearly 20 years after its founding, JRS was officially registered as a foundation of the Vatican City State on 19 March 2000.

Today, JRS works in over 55 countries serving more than 1.5 million people.

=== Mission ===
JRS's mission is to accompany, serve, and advocate on behalf of refugees and other forcibly displaced persons, that they may heal, learn, and determine their own future.

As an international humanitarian NGO, JRS strives to implement the magis ideal of Ignatius of Loyola, founder of the Jesuits. One of the key messages of the 35th Jesuit General Congregation (2008) was to reach new physical, cultural, religious and social frontiers, to those who are estranged, a task confirmed by two Popes. The search for new frontiers has taken JRS to places where refugees face deprivation and abuse of their basic rights: traditional refugee camps, detention centres and prisons, conflict zones, border areas, and in the heart of big cities, including Iraq and Syria.

On 24 May 2019, Jesuit Superior General Arturo Sosa called all Jesuits to "renewed commitment" to JRS in accord with the Jesuits' newly promulgated apostolic preferences, endorsed by Pope Francis. For its part JRS is restructuring to produce "strong country offices that will strengthen local capacity and encourage subsidiarity." JRS defined its priorities for 2019-2023 as, "the promotion of reconciliation and social cohesion; the delivery of quality formal and informal education; innovative livelihood programmes that lead to self-reliance and sustainability; and effective advocacy for the rights of refugees."

JRS is a signatory to the Immunization Agenda 2030 pledge, seeking to increase the worldwide uptake of vaccines in support of the Sustainable Development Goals.

== Refugees ==
In deciding with whom to work, JRS finds the scope of existing international conventions is too restrictive. It therefore applies the expression 'de facto refugee' to all "persons persecuted because of race, religion, membership of social or political groups"; to "the victims of armed conflicts, erroneous economic policy or natural disasters"; and, for "humanitarian reasons", to internally displaced persons, that is, civilians who "are forcibly uprooted from their homes by the same type of violence as refugees but who do not cross national frontiers."

Since the above definition refers only to individuals in fear of persecution, regional organisations in both Africa (African Union 1969) and Latin America (Organisation for American States 1984) have developed wider definitions which include mass displacements which occur as a result of social and economic collapse in the context of conflict. JRS strives by "accompaniment" to respect the human dignity of all refugees throughout their ordeal.

== UNHCR ==
On the website of the United Nations High Commissioner for Refugees, detailed recent reports are given of JRS work under the following categories: Country Reports, Fact Finding Reports, Handbooks/Manuals, Legal Articles/Analyses/Commentaries, Policy/Position Papers, Regional Reports, and Thematic Reports.
