= K. J. Derks =

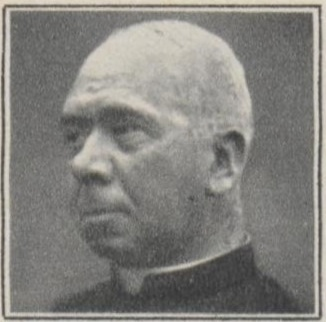
K. J. Derks (c. 1932)

Karel Josef Derks (1875–1962) was a Dutch Jesuit educator and historian.

== Life ==
Derks was born in Nijmegen on 27 August 1875 and was educated at the Dominicus College, Nijmegen. He entered the Jesuit novitiate at Mariëndaal near Grave on 26 September 1894. He became a history teacher at Canisius College, Nijmegen, and later (1924–1942) also a part-time lecturer on history at the Katholieke Leergangen, Tilburg (a precursor of Tilburg University), and later still (1944–1947) in Roermond. Derks died at Canisius College, Nijmegen, on 26 February 1962.

== Writings ==
Derks was a contributor to several reference works, including the Nieuw Nederlandsch Biografisch Woordenboek and Katholieke Encyclopaedie, and to the periodicals Historisch Tijdschrift, Streven and Studiën.

He was also the author of several books:

- Jeanne d'Arc (Nijmegen, 1910)
- Onze Lieve Vrouw van den Polder (1947)
- Bij het honderdjarig bestaan van de Nederlandse Provincie der Sociëteit van Jezus (1949)
- Gedenkboek St. Canisiuscollege, 1900-1950 (Nijmegen, 1950)
- Levensschets van Rodulf van Oppenraay (Den Bosch, 1953)
- Pater Henricus van Ruth: Een apostel en sociaal werker in de 20ste eeuw (Nijmegen, 1954)
