= Calvez =

- Pronunciation: pronounced [kalvɛ(s)]

Origin
- Meaning: carpenter
- Region of origin: Brittany

Other names
- Variant forms: Le Calvez, Caluer

Calvez is a surname, and may refer to:

Calvez derives from kalvez which means carpenter in Breton. (cf. Kalvez)

- Anne-Sophie Calvez, French skater
- Jean-Yves Calvez, French Jesuit, theologian, philosopher, economist
- Léon Le Calvez, French road bicycle racer
- Yolande Le Calvez, French geologist, palaeontologist and geological engineer
