= Aloysius Gottifredi =

Italian Jesuit

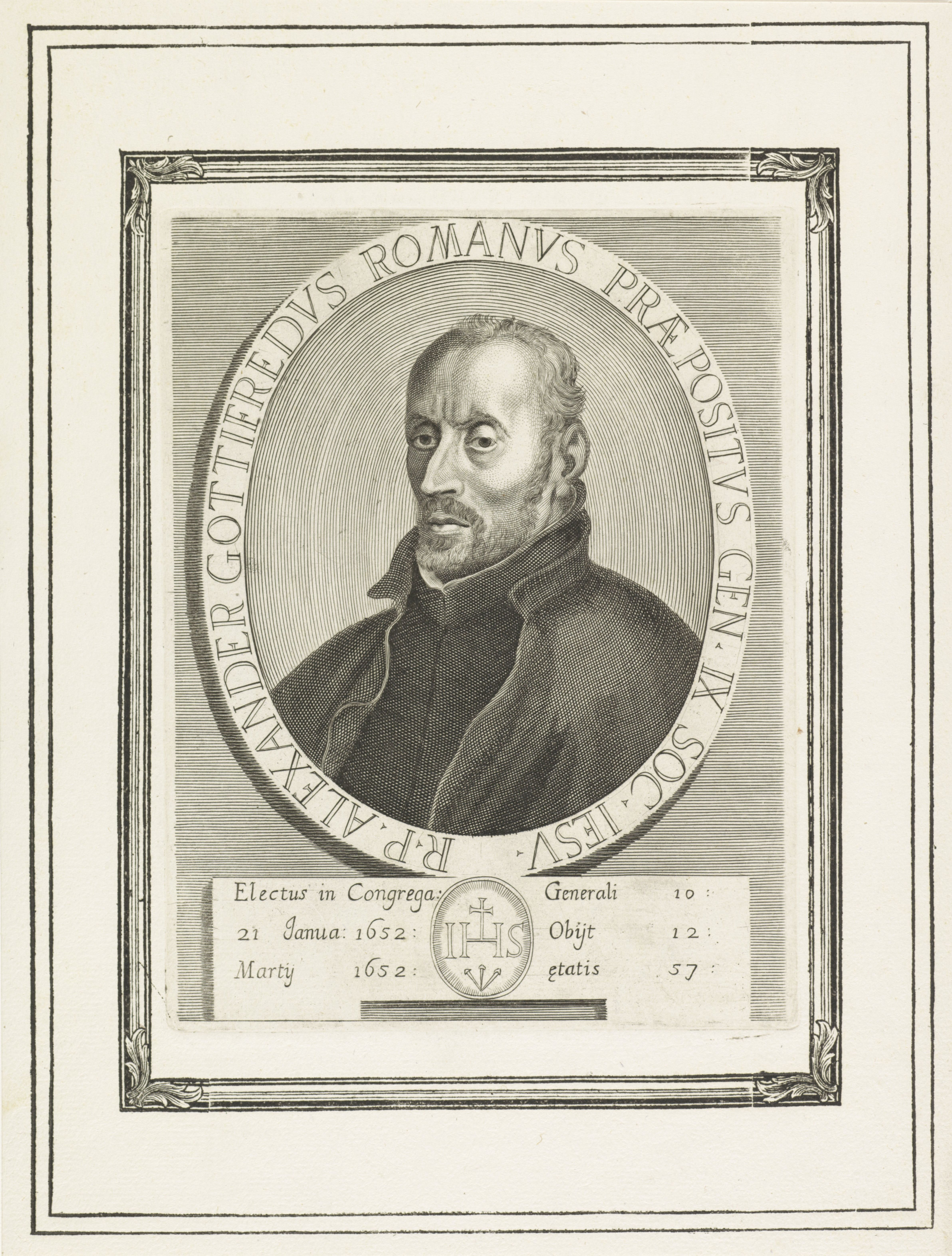
- Born: May 3, 1596
- Died: March 12, 1652 (aged 55); Rome, Italy

Aloysius (Alessandro Luigi) Gottifredi (3 May 1595 – 12 March 1652) was an Italian Jesuit, the ninth Superior-General of the Society of Jesus. His service is the shortest of anyone to hold the office.

Two months after his election, Father Gottifredi died at the house of the professed Fathers, Rome, before the electing Fathers could assemble in the General Congregation that was to follow. This Congregation remains the only one to have elected two Superiors General, as it immediately elected Gottifredi's successor, Goswin Nickel.

Gottifredi had been a professor of Theology and Rector of the Roman College, and later secretary of the Society under Father Mutius Vitelleschi.

Catholic Church titles
| Preceded by Francisco Piccolomini | Superior General of the Society of Jesus; 1652–1652 | Succeeded by Goschwin Nickel |
