= Goschwin Nickel =

German Jesuit priest (1582–1664)

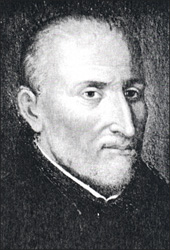
- Born: c. 1582; Koslar, Germany
- Died: July 31, 1664 (aged 81–82); Rome, Italy

Goswin Nickel (1582 – 31 July 1664) was a German Jesuit priest and the tenth Superior-General of the Society of Jesus.

Goswin was born in Koslar, North-Westphalia (Germany). He studied in Paderborn and Mainz (1611–1615), where he was promoted priest on 28 October 1614.

He was elected Superior-General less than a week after the death of his predecessor Aloysius Gottifredi, on 17 March 1652.

During these years the quarrels with the Jansenist theologians were growing more and more acrimonious, especially in France where Blaise Pascal, French scientist, philosopher and Jansenist sympathizer was leading the attack on the Jesuits. The great controversy on the Chinese Rites (1645) continued. Owing to his great age, Father Nickel obtained from the 11th General Congregation the election of Gian Paolo Oliva as vicar-general with right of succession (on 7 June 1661). This was approved by Alexander VII.

The German novelist Thomas Mann mentions Nickel in his famous book The Magic Mountain, bringing up a relatively forgotten quote by the Superior-General about love for one's fatherland, which Nickel called "a plague with the most certain death of Christian love". This notion of Nickel's has already been touched on in the Finnish philosopher Edward Westermark's book The Origin and Development of Moral Ideas, back in 1917.

Nickel died in Rome.

Catholic Church titles
Preceded by Aloysius Gottifredi	Superior General of the Society of Jesus; 1652–1664	Succeeded by Gian Paolo Oliva
