= Adolfo Nicolás =

Spanish Jesuit priest (1936–2020)

The Very Reverend Adolfo Nicolás S.J.
- Superior-General Emeritus of the Society of Jesus
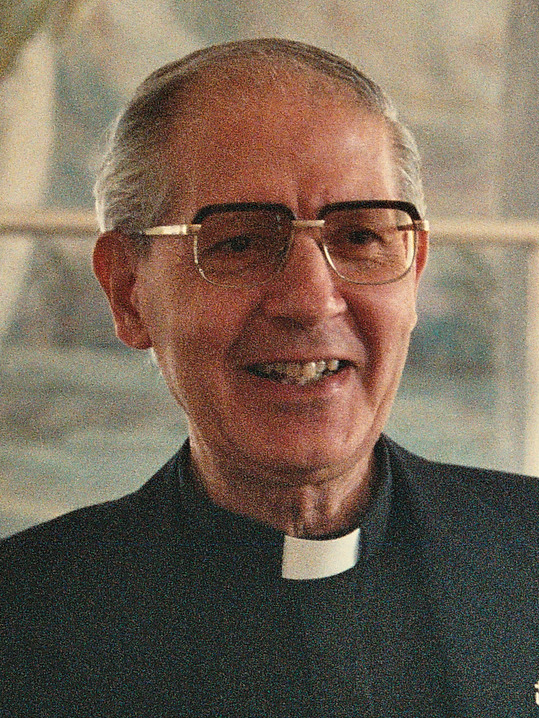
- Nicolás in 2008
- Church: Catholic Church
- Installed: 19 January 2008
- Term ended: 3 October 2016
- Predecessor: Peter Hans Kolvenbach
- Successor: Arturo Sosa

Orders
- Ordination: 17 March 1967

Personal details
- Born: Adolfo Nicolás Pachón; 29 April 1936 Villamuriel de Cerrato, Spain
- Died: 20 May 2020 (aged 84) Tokyo, Japan
- Education: University of Alcalá; Sophia University; Pontifical Gregorian University

Adolfo Nicolás Pachón SJ (29 April 1936 – 20 May 2020) was a Spanish Catholic priest who served as the 30th superior general of the Society of Jesus from 2008 to 2016. He previously taught at Sophia University in Tokyo for twenty years and headed educational institutions in Manila from 1978 to 1984 and in Tokyo from 1991 to 1993. He led the Jesuits in Japan from 1993 to 1996 and, after four years of pastoral work in Tokyo, led the Jesuits in Asia from 2004 to 2008.

Though elected superior general for life, Nicolás, like his predecessor Peter Hans Kolvenbach, resigned, as the Jesuit constitutions permit.

== Early life and education ==
Adolfo Nicolás Pachón was born on 29 April 1936 in Villamuriel de Cerrato, Palencia. He entered the Society of Jesus, more commonly known as the Jesuits, in the novitiate of Aranjuez in 1953. He studied at the University of Alcalá, where he earned his licentiate in philosophy. He traveled to Japan in 1960 to familiarize himself with Japanese language and culture. He began his theological studies for the priesthood at Sophia University in Tokyo in 1964, and was ordained to the priesthood on 17 March 1967.

== Priestly ministry ==
From 1968 to 1971, he studied at the Pontifical Gregorian University in Rome, from where he earned a doctorate in theology. Upon his return to Japan, Nicolás was made professor of systematic theology at his alma mater of Sophia University, teaching there for the next twenty years.

He was Director of the East Asian Pastoral Institute at the Ateneo de Manila University, in Quezon City, Philippines, from 1978 to 1984, and later served as rector of the theologate in Tokyo from 1991 to 1993, when he was appointed Provincial of the Jesuit Province of Japan. At the end of his six-year term as Provincial in 1999, he spent four years doing pastoral work among poor immigrants in Tokyo.

In 2004 he was named President of the Jesuit Conference of Provincials for Eastern Asia and Oceania, with his office in the Philippines. As Moderator, he was at the service of the Jesuits of several countries, including Australia, China, Japan, Korea, Micronesia, Myanmar, and East Timor.

In addition to his native Spanish, Nicolás spoke Catalan, English, Italian, French, and Japanese.

== Superior General of the Society of Jesus ==
On the second ballot of the thirty-fifth General Congregation of the Society of Jesus, Nicolás was elected as the Order’s thirtieth Superior General on 19 January 2008, succeeding the Dutch Fr. Peter Hans Kolvenbach who resigned. His election was immediately relayed to Pope Benedict XVI, who confirmed him in the post. Nicolás headed a congregation which then numbered 18,500 members.

Many have marked the similarities between Nicolás and former Superior General Pedro Arrupe. Father Arrupe, like his eventual successor, was a Spanish missionary in Japan. Nicolás described Arrupe, whom he had earlier had as Provincial Superior, as a "great missionary, a national hero, a man on fire."

=== General Curia restructuring ===
In March 2011, Nicolás forwarded a communiqué of revisions to the General Curia restructuring the secretariats, including the creation of new positions and a commission. This was in accord with a task given him by the previous General Congregation.

=== Resignation ===
Nicolás, after consulting with Pope Francis, determined to resign after his 80th birthday, and initiated the process of calling a Jesuit General Congregation to elect his successor. Until the resignation of his predecessor, Peter Hans Kolvenbach, it was not the norm for a Jesuit Superior General to resign; like the great majority of the Popes up until Benedict XVI, they generally served until death. However, the Jesuit constitutions include provision for a resignation.

Nicolás announced his intention to resign at age 80 and convoked the thirty-sixth General Congregation, which was convened in Rome on 2 October 2016 and appointed his successor, Arturo Sosa from Venezuela.

== Beliefs and values ==
=== Missionary work ===
Nicolás once stated, "Asia has a lot yet to offer the Church, to the whole Church, but we haven't done it yet. Maybe we have not been courageous enough, or we haven't taken the risks we should." In an article on Nicolás, Michael McVeigh said that Nicolás had also expressed his admiration of missionaries who are more concerned with teaching orthodoxy than in having a cultural experience with the local people. "

In the homily of the Mass celebrated after his election as Superior General, Nicolás emphasized service, based on the scriptural reading for that day, the words of St. Ignatius of Loyola, and Benedict XVI's teaching on God is love. He stated: "The more we become as servants, the more pleased God is." Delving further into the scriptural passage and after relating an anecdote of experiences with the poor in Asia, he related poverty with having God as the only source of strength, pointing out that the Jesuit's strength is not in externals (power, media, etc.) nor in internal fortitude (research). "The poor only have God in whom to find strength. For us only God is our strength."

Nicolas also developed the following ideas: the message of the Jesuits is "a message of salvation" and the challenge of discerning the type of salvation that people today are waiting for.

=== Obedience to Rome ===
After receiving a message from Pope Benedict asking the Society of Jesus to affirm its fidelity to the magisterium and the Holy See, the Congregation presided over by Nicolás responded, "The Society of Jesus was born within the Church, we live in the Church, we were approved by the Church and we serve the Church. This is our vocation... [Unity with the pope] is the symbol of our union with Christ. It also is the guarantee that our mission will not be a 'small mission', a project just of the Jesuits, but that our mission is the mission of the Church."

=== Liberation theology ===
In a November 2008 interview with El Periodico, Nicolás described liberation theology as a "courageous and creative response to an unbearable situation of injustice in Latin America." These remarks were particularly controversial since some forms of liberation theology had been critised by Pope John Paul II and by Pope Benedict XVI, when he was still Prefect of the Congregation for the Doctrine of the Faith. However, the Superior General also added, "As with any theology, liberation theology needs years to mature. It's a shame that it has not been given a vote of confidence and that soon its wings will be cut before it learns to fly. It needs more time." Then in September 2013, six months after the election of Pope Francis, Catholic New Service reported "a reversal of policy [toward liberation theology] under Pope Francis, ... the fruit of a long and painful process, through which the church has clarified the nature of its commitment to the world's poor today", showing "an indestructible love for Christ [sic: Christ's] poor. And that love changes everything."

=== Economic justice ===
In June 2016, Nicolás transmitted to all the Jesuits a document, Justice In The Global Economy, that suggested a greater commitment to the cause of world economic justice. The text, written by Jesuits and lay experts, introduced a series of reforms that could reduce inequalities, which included calls for public policies aimed at redistribution of wealth, good governance of natural and mineral resources, stricter regulation of the economic and financial markets, combating corruption and for more developed nations to allocate 0.7% of their GDP for the development of poorer countries.

== Death ==
Nicolás died on 20 May 2020 in Tokyo at the age of 84. He had been ill in the last years of his life, which he spent at the Loyola House in Kamishakujii. News of his death was first announced by the Jesuit Curia in Rome.

Catholic Church titles
Preceded by Peter Hans Kolvenbach	Superior General of the Society of Jesus; 2008–2016	Succeeded by Arturo Sosa
