= Peter Hans Kolvenbach =

Superior General of the Society of Jesus (1928–2016)

The Very Reverend Peter Hans Kolvenbach SJ
- 29th Superior General of the Society of Jesus
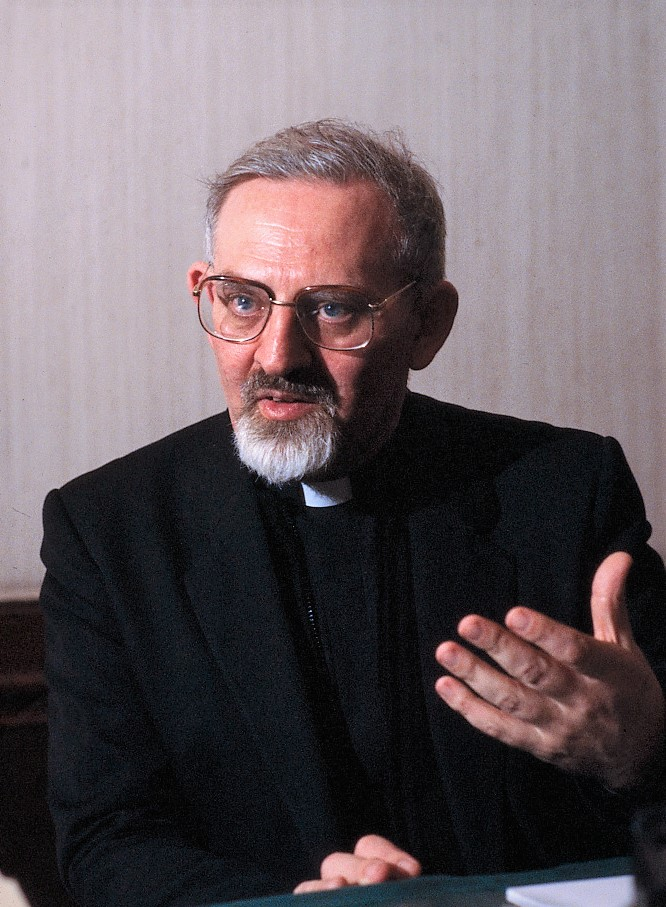
- Kolvenbach in 1984
- Installed: 13 September 1983
- Term ended: 14 January 2008
- Predecessor: Pedro Arrupe
- Successor: Adolfo Nicolás Pachón

Orders
- Ordination: 29 June 1961 by Armenian Catholic Church

Personal details
- Born: Peter Hans Kolvenbach; 30 September 1928 Druten, Netherlands
- Died: 26 November 2016 (aged 88) Beirut, Lebanon
- Buried: Collège Notre Dame de Jamhour, Beirut
- Denomination: Catholic
- Occupation: Jesuit professor, linguist
- Education: Canisius College, Nijmegen
- Alma mater: Université de Saint-Joseph, Beirut

Peter Hans Kolvenbach (30 November 1928 – 26 November 2016) was a Dutch Catholic priest and professor who was the 29th superior general of the Society of Jesus from 1983 to 2008.

== Early years ==
Kolvenbach was born and grew up in Druten, near Nijmegen in the Netherlands. There he attended Canisius College for his secondary studies, where he concentrated on modern languages. He entered the novitiate at Mariendaal on 7 September 1948. After completing philosophy studies at Berchmans Institute in Nijmegen, he was assigned to Lebanon, where he completed his doctorate in Sacred Theology at Université de Saint-Joseph in Beirut. On 29 June 1961, he was ordained a priest in the Armenian Catholic Church, an Eastern-rite church in communion with Rome.

The next years of his life were spent in academia, specifically in linguistics. From 1964 to 1976 he taught general and Oriental linguistics in The Hague, Paris, and then Beirut where he became Professor of General Linguistics and Armenian at Université Saint-Joseph. He served in that capacity until 1981, when he became rector of the Pontifical Oriental Institute.

During his time on the faculty of Saint-Joseph, he also served as superior of the Jesuit Near-East Vice-Province.

== Father General ==
On 7 August 1981, Father General Pedro Arrupe suffered a severe stroke in the plane on his way back to Rome. Although he survived for another ten years, he wanted to step down as Superior General. Though Arrupe proposed Vincent O'Keefe of Fordham University as interim successor, Pope John Paul II intervened and named Paolo Dezza his delegate to lead the order for an interim period. Two years later John Paul II allowed the Jesuits to proceed in selecting their new leader. Meeting in September 1983, the 33rd General Congregation of the Society of Jesus accepted the formal resignation of Father Arrupe and on the first ballot elected Father Kolvenbach to be 29th Superior General of the Jesuits.

Kolvenbach took office at a time when the Jesuits' "strongly pro-social justice and church reform orientation was seen by critics as having made the Jesuits something akin to John Paul’s in-house opposition. ...Over time, Kolvenbach was credited with having managed to win back the trust of John Paul II and his Vatican team, without alienating the more liberal members of the order."

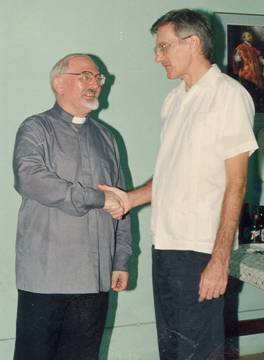
Meeting a fellow Jesuit personally.

He is credited with successfully defending Jesuit theologian Jacques Dupuis from charges made by the Congregation for the Doctrine of the Faith, and Fr. Thomas J. Reese, who was removed as editor of America magazine by the insistence of the Vatican, says that he “always felt that Kolvenbach did everything he could to defend me.” He manifested his personal interest in each Jesuit's work, with an interest in meeting each Jesuit individually. He traveled extensively to visit Jesuits in 112 countries, and “his knowledge of them and their ministries is legendary.” He also emphasized the need to make laypersons feel their place of equal partnership in Jesuit ministries, recognizing with Vatican II that “holiness is one - that sanctity is cultivated by all who are moved by the Spirit of God'." He expressed his belief that “the church of the next millennium will be called the 'church of the laity' ...this development is a 'grace of our day and a hope for the future'."

== Resignation and retirement ==
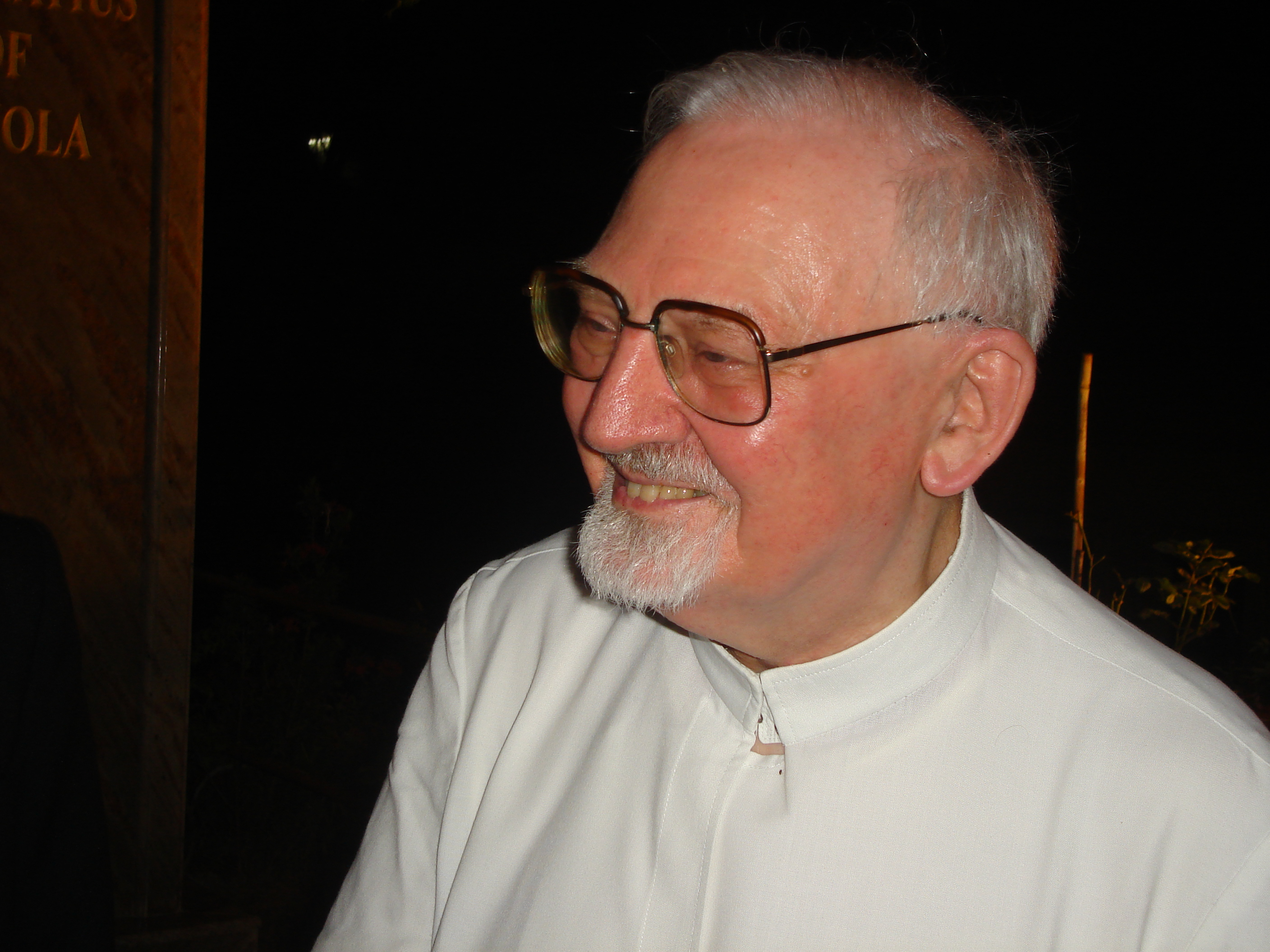
Kolvenbach in Goa, India, in 2006

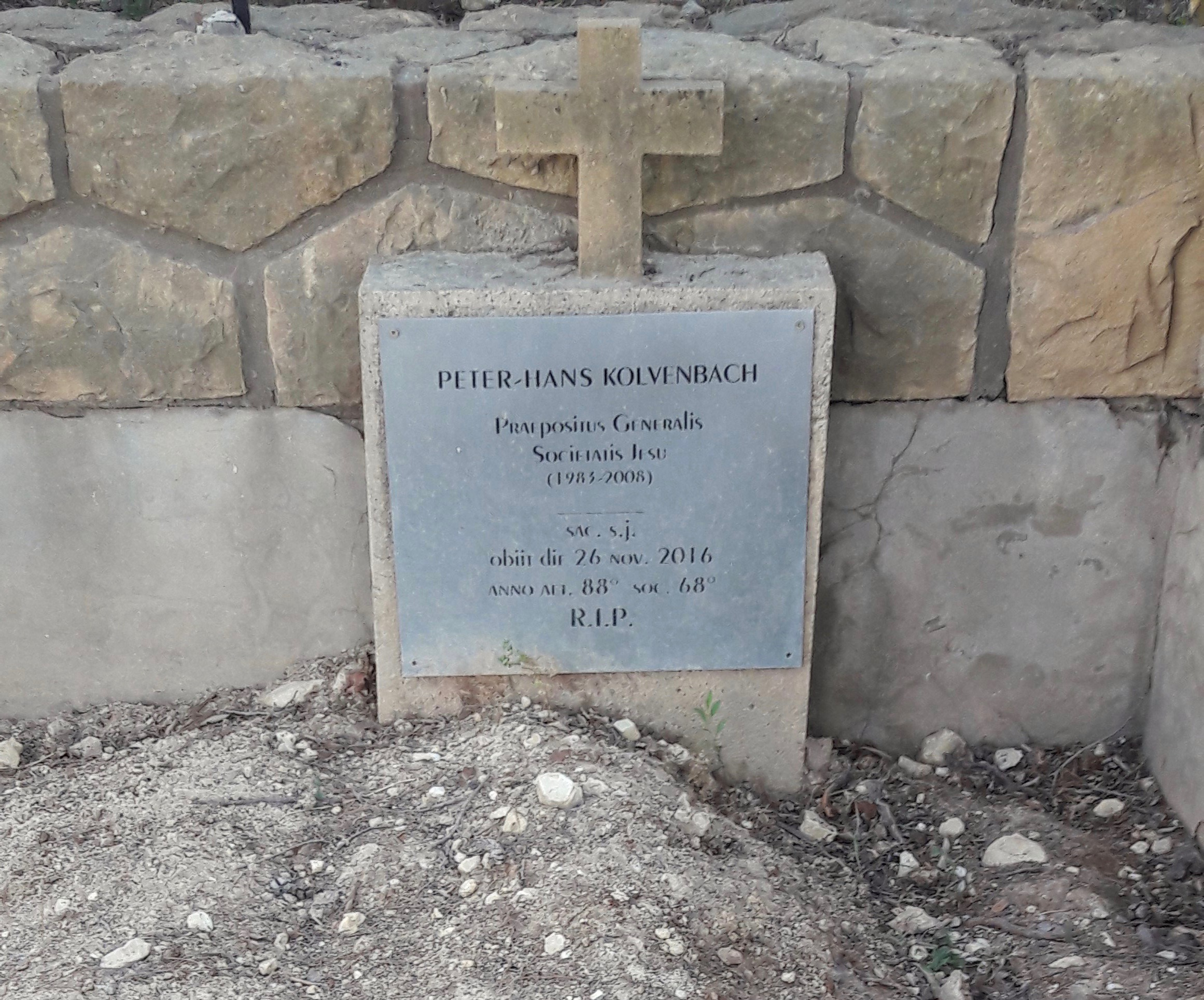
Grave in Collège Notre Dame de Jamhour

On 2 February 2006, Kolvenbach informed the members of the Society of Jesus that he intended to step down in 2008, the year he would turn 80. As the Superior General is elected for life, Kolvenbach was only the second to resign the office.

The 35th General Congregation of the Society of Jesus convened on 5 January 2008 in Rome. On 14 January it accepted Kolvenbach's resignation and elected Adolfo Nicolás as his successor.

Kolvenbach died in Beirut on 26 November 2016 and is buried outside Beirut on the grounds of Collège Notre Dame de Jamhour. He left just before his death a personal letter to a young medicine doctor, Anthony Kallas-Chemaly, who worked with him on the history of the Jesuits.

Catholic Church titles
Preceded by Pedro Arrupe	Superior General of the Society of Jesus; 1983–2008	Succeeded by Adolfo Nicolás
