= Jean-Baptiste Janssens =

Belgian Jesuit priest

The Very Reverend Jean-Baptiste Janssens SJ
- 27th Superior General of the Society of Jesus
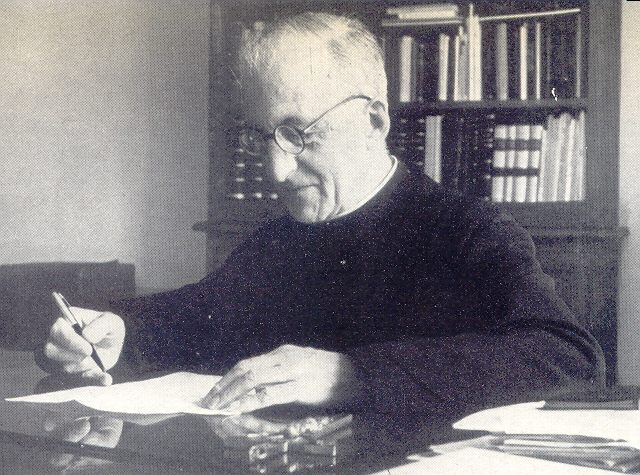
- Installed: 15 September 1946
- Term ended: 5 October 1964
- Predecessor: Wlodimir Ledóchowski
- Successor: Pedro Arrupe

Personal details
- Born: 22 December 1889 Mechelen, Belgium
- Died: 5 October 1964 (aged 74)
- Buried: Campo Verano, Rome, Italy
- Denomination: Roman Catholic
- Education: Facultés universitaires Saint-Louis

Jean-Baptiste Janssens SJ (22 December 1889 – 5 October 1964) was a Belgian Catholic priest who was the 27th Superior General of the Society of Jesus. He was born in Mechelen, Belgium.

== Early life and schooling ==
Janssens' first schooling was in the Diocesan Secondary School in Hasselt, and his university years, where he excelled in philosophy and classical philology, were spent at St. Aloysius University Faculty in Brussels. He entered the Jesuit novitiate in Drongen on 23 September 1907, and took his first vows in September 1909.

After the usual two years of philosophy spent at the Jesuit theological college in Leuven he earned his doctorate in civil law at the Catholic University of Louvain. From 1921 to 1923 he attended the Gregorian University in Rome where he added a doctorate in Canon law to the one he had earned at Louvain.

He taught canon law at the Jesuit theologate in Leuven from 1923 until 1929 and became its rector on 17 August 1929. On 15 August 1935 he was appointed Tertian Master and in 1938 became Provincial of the Northern Belgian Province of the Jesuits.

In 1939, Janssens made an official visit to the Jesuit missions in the Belgian Congo. With the exception of this visitation and his two years studying in Rome, he had spent most of his life in his own province: in Leuven, Drongen (Ghent), Antwerp, and Brussels. In 1945 he kept in hiding a large group of Jewish children in the Provincial's residence of Brussels, which earned him the title of Righteous among the nations.

== Elected Superior General ==
When Jesuit Superior General Wlodimir Ledóchowski died in 1942, World War II was in full fury in Europe and Janssens was the Jesuit Provincial trying to keep his province intact. The Vicar General, Norbert de Boynes, was unable to call a General Congregation because of the war. Thus, in effect, de Boynes was in charge of the governance of the Society for three years.

The war ended in August 1945 and de Boynes was finally able to convene a General Congregation – the 29th – between 6 September and 23 October 1946. Janssens, as Provincial of his province, went to Rome as a delegate. The Congregation was held under Spartan conditions and many of the necessities were provided by the delegates from countries less affected by the war than the countries of Europe. On 15 September, the 57-year-old Belgian Jean-Baptiste Janssens was elected Superior General of the Society of Jesus.

== Generalate ==
Because of his delicate health and the oppressiveness of the Roman air, a sizeable piece of property in the Alban Hills – southeast of Rome – was purchased as a retreat for the general and his curia. This property, well known in the area as Villa Cavalletti, became a place of retreat not only for the general and the curia but also for the other Jesuits of Rome. It was also used by professors and students of the Gregorian University who could manage to get away for a few days of peace.

In his famous Instruction on the Social Apostolate (1949), considered a milestone in the Society's road to commitment to the so-called "social question", Janssens challenged the Jesuit educational institutions. In bold language for those days, the general speaks of completely uprooting the spirit of "caste" among Jesuits and their students. They should not appear "to be allied with the rich and the capitalists". Those especially who labor in the educational ministry should manifest "an interest and concern for the proletariat that is equal to, or even greater than, that shown to the rich". One can imagine the impact of these words on the schools. Nevertheless, disaffection toward the colleges remained strong, especially among young Jesuits.

In 1957, after eleven years in office, he summoned the 30th General Congregation to provide him with a vicar general. During the 6 September to 11 November session, the delegates elected Canadian John Swain to the position.

In 1960, in a letter to those engaged in education, the general had to confront those who doubted whether the colleges were a ministry proper to the Society or who asserted that they were not in conformity with the spirit of St. Ignatius.

Janssens took important steps for the restructuring of the educational apostolate. Both on the provincial and national levels he set up offices of general Prefects of Studies. In this way there was more coordination among the colleges, both province and nationwide, as well as closer international collaboration. He appointed visitors of the colleges in various countries and regions, for example, Spain and Latin America. National and regional educational associations were encouraged within the Society. Statutes were elaborated to guide the work of the Prefects of Studies. In 1960, the first international meeting of experts in the college apostolate was held in Rome for the purpose of formulating common criteria of inspiration and action. The work of education in the Society was taking on a corporate character.

Pope John XXIII had convened the Second Vatican Council to begin in 1962 to deal with many of the same problems that plagued Janssens during his generalate, Janssens had called for a diversification of Jesuit ministries to include more direct service to the poor.

== Final years ==
After 18 years and one month as Superior General, Janssens died at the age of 74 on 5 October 1964. His body was taken to the Jesuit vault at Campo Verano where most of the Jesuits who die in Rome are interred.

Catholic Church titles
Preceded by Wlodimir Ledóchowski	Superior General of the Society of Jesus; 1946–1964	Succeeded by Pedro Arrupe
