= Canisius College, Nijmegen =

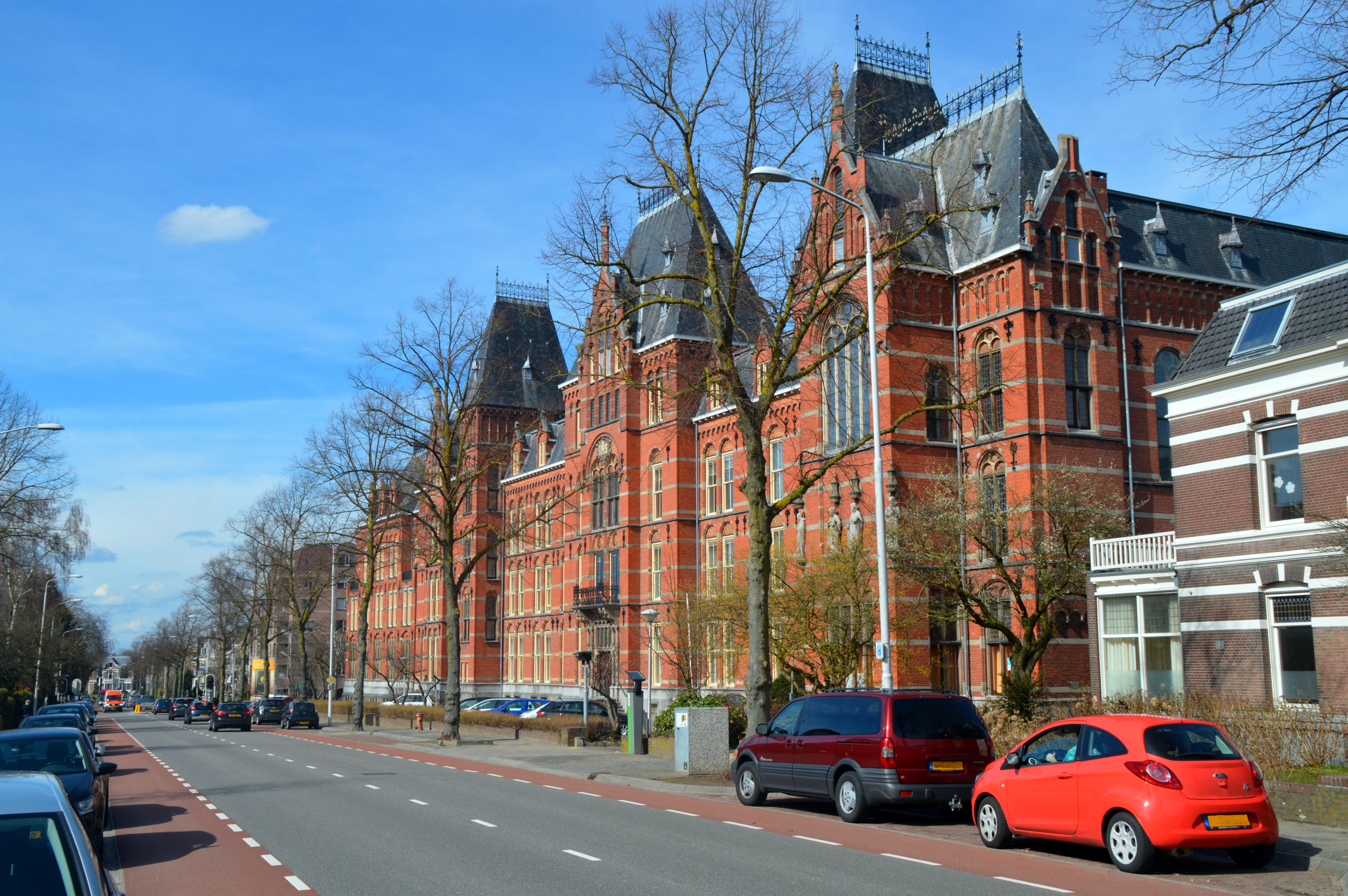
- Canisius at Internaat
- Nijmegen; Netherlands

Information
- Motto: Grasp what's inside!
- Religious affiliation: Catholic
- Denomination: Jesuit (until 2005)
- Established: 1900; 126 years ago
- Rector: Joan Roelof Janssen
- Gender: Coeducational
- Enrollment: 1,350 (Berg and Dalseweg) (2019); 543 (Goffert); 51 (Akkerlaan/ISK) (2013)
- Website: www.canisiuscollege.nl
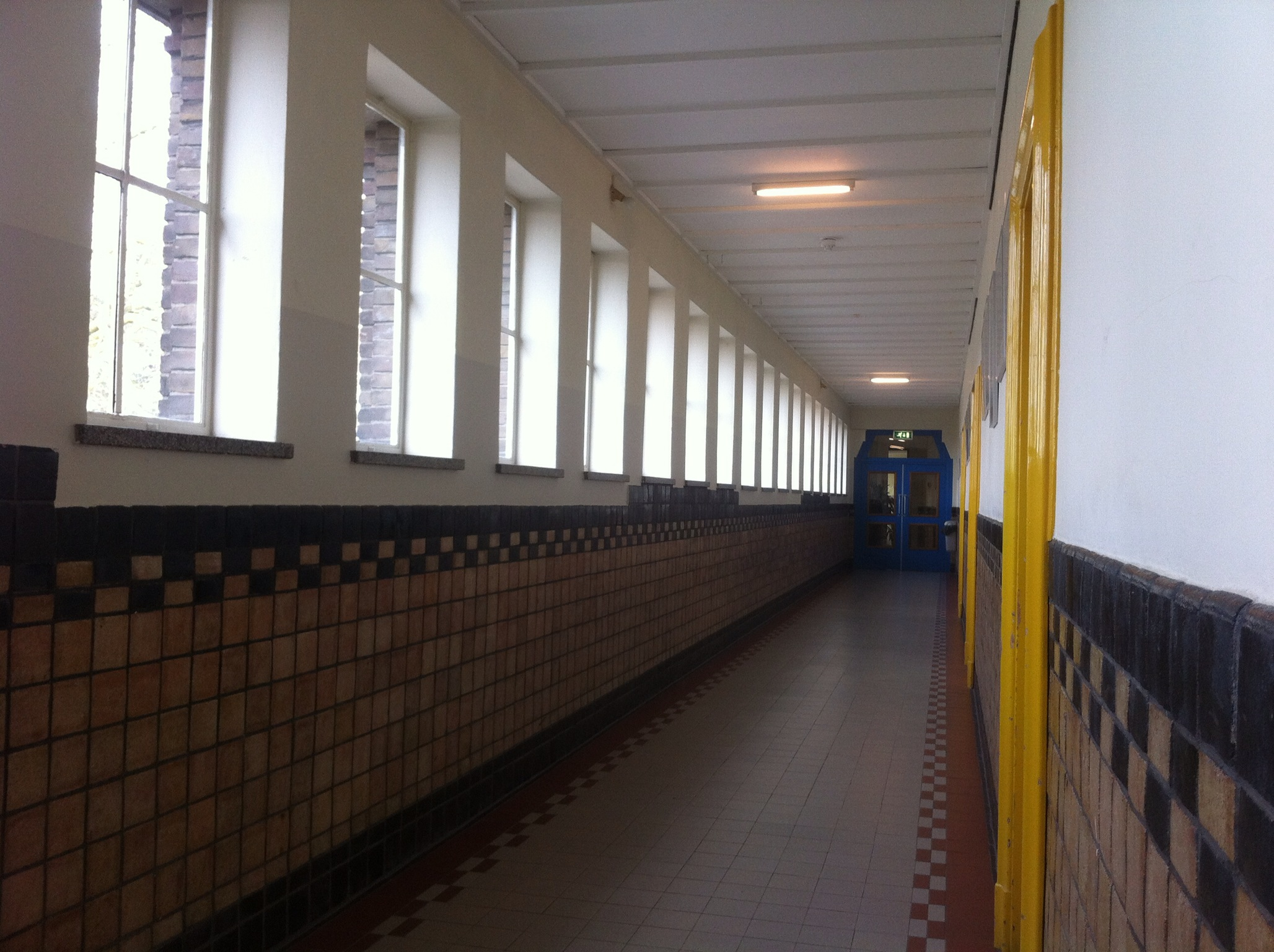

Canisius College, Nijmegen, is a Catholic school in Nijmegen, in the Netherlands. It has departments for VMBO, HAVO, athenaeum, and gymnasium.

The school offers "bridging" for foreign students who enter without fluency in Dutch. The school is named after the saint Peter Canisius and is the legal successor to a former Jesuit boarding school of the same name. Since 2005 there have been no Jesuits at Canisius.

Besides the main location there are two branches: De Goffert for pre-vocational secondary including LWOO, and Akkerlaan the international bridging school. In 2013 enrollment at Canisius' three locations was: 1,441 at Berg and Dalseweg, 543 at Goffert, and 51 at Akkerlaan / ISK.

On 1 January 2002 the boards of four Nijmegen secondary schools merged to form Nijmegen School Group, which includes Canisius College, Nijmegen Comprehensive School Groenewoud (NSG), Kandinsky College, and St. George's School. Teaching is at four levels, VMBO (base, frame, mixed, theoretical), secondary school, grammar school, and high school. The school has a main building, gym, and additional building with classrooms and a gym.

== Notable alumni ==
- Daphne Deckers, model and columnist
- Jan van Hoof, resistance fighter
- Vincent Janssen, footballer
- Peter Hans Kolvenbach, Superior General of Jesuits
- Ruud Lubbers, politician
- Hans van Mierlo, politician
- Thomas Olde Heuvelt, writer
- Peter van Uhm, former Chief of Defence

== See also ==
- List of Jesuit schools
- List of Jesuit sites in the Netherlands
