= Philippe Lécrivain =

French Jesuit priest and historian (1941–2020)

- Born: 1 August 1941; Le Blanc, France
- Died: 13 April 2020 (aged 78); Paris, France
- Occupation: Priest

Philippe Lécrivain (1 August 1941 – 13 April 2020) was a French Jesuit priest and historian.

== Biography ==
Lécrivain was born in Le Blanc on 1 August 1941. He was ordained in the Diocese of Rennes in 1968, and joined the Society of Jesus in 1978 in Lyon.

Lécrivain held a bachelor's degree in sociology, a master's degree in medieval and modern history, and a doctorate in theology. He often wrote of the history of Christianity and spirituality, as well as religious life. He directed the Jesuit centre on Rue Blomet in Paris from 1985 to 1987. He was a professor of Catholic history at the Centre Sèvres and a lecturer at Sciences Po.

Philippe Lécrivain died on 13 April 2020 in Paris at the age of 78 due to COVID-19.

== Publications ==
- Histoire des dogmes (1995)
- Histoire du christianisme (1997)
- Les millénarismes du christianisme antique et médiéval (2001)
- Pour une plus grande gloire de Dieu : Les missions jésuites (1991, 2005)
- Paris au temps d'Ignace de Loyola (1528–1535) (2006)
- Comprendre le catholicisme (2008)
- Une manière de vivre : les religieux aujourd'hui (2009)
- Histoire des dogmes tome. 2; l’homme et son salut (2012)
- Les Jésuites (2013)
- Les premiers siècles jésuites, Jalons pour une histoire (1540–1814) (2016)
