= Vincent O'Keefe =

American Jesuit priest (1920–2012)

Vincent O'Keefe, S.J. (1920 – July 22, 2012) was an American Jesuit priest who served as the order's vicar general and as president of Fordham University.

== Biography ==
In 1981 the order's superior general, Pedro Arrupe, suffered a stroke. O'Keefe was appointed Vicar General to guide the Jesuits as they began the process of selecting a new General. The pope, in a highly unusual and historic decision, intervened and appointed instead Jesuit Father Paolo Dezza as a special pontifical delegate to serve as the Jesuits' interim leader.

In 2004, O'Keefe responded to criticisms from Malachi Martin and stated that Martin had been released from all his priestly vows save the vow of chastity. It is claimed that attacks were mounted on Martin in retaliation for his book The Jesuits, which is hostile to the Jesuit order, of which he had formerly been a member. In the book, he accuses the Jesuits of deviating from their original character and mission by embracing Liberation Theology.

O'Keefe voted for John Kerry in the 2004 American elections. A self-described Democrat and fan of Franklin Delano Roosevelt, O'Keefe chose Kerry even though he disagreed with the senator's position on abortion.
