= Pedro Arrupe =

Spanish Jesuit priest and 28th Superior General of the Society of Jesus

Servant of God Pedro Arrupe y Gondra SJ
- 28th Superior General of the Society of Jesus
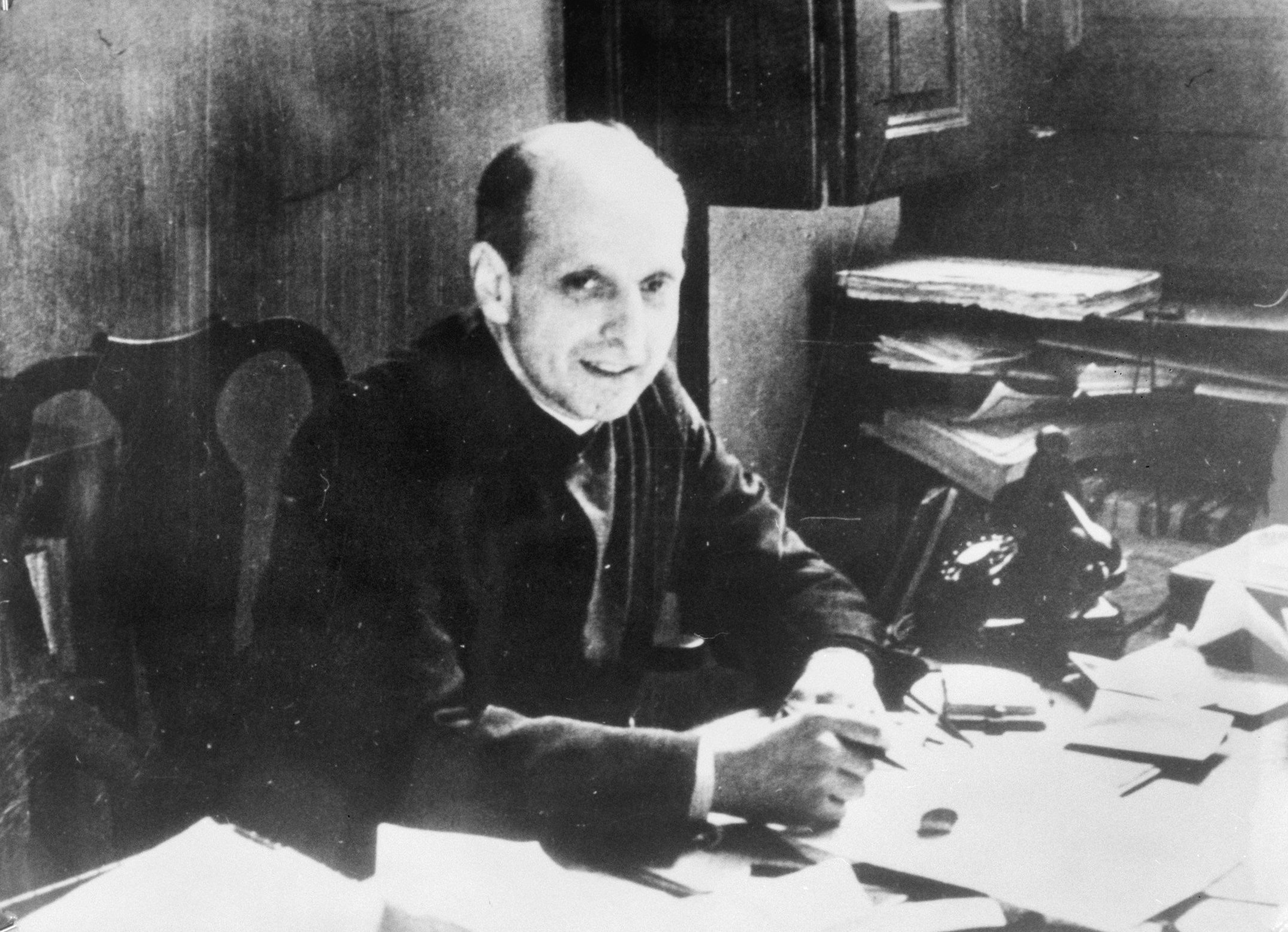
- Arrupe in 1965
- Installed: 22 May 1965
- Term ended: 3 September 1983 due to a paralyzing stroke
- Predecessor: Jean-Baptiste Janssens
- Successor: Peter Hans Kolvenbach

Orders
- Ordination: 30 July 1936

Personal details
- Born: Pedro Arrupe y Gondra; 14 November 1907 Bilbao, Basque Country, Spain
- Died: 5 February 1991 (aged 83) Rome, Italy
- Buried: Church of the Gesù, Rome
- Denomination: Roman Catholic
- Education: Complutense University of Madrid
- Motto: "Only by being a man for others does one become fully human."

Pedro Arrupe y Gondra, SJ (14 November 1907 – 5 February 1991) was a Basque Spanish Catholic priest who served as the 28th superior general of the Society of Jesus from 1965 to 1983. He has been called a second founder of the Society, which he led in the implementation of the Second Vatican Council, especially with regard to faith that does justice and preferential option for the poor.

Born in 1907 in Bilbao, Arrupe joined the Jesuits in 1927 and was ordained to the priesthood in 1936. While serving as a novice master outside Hiroshima in 1945, Arrupe used his medical background as a first responder to the atomic bombing of Hiroshima.

In 1983, paralysis from a stroke caused Arrupe to resign from office. He lived on until 1991, when he died in the local Jesuit infirmary. His cause for sainthood was opened by the Jesuits and the Diocese of Rome in 2018.

== Education and training ==
Arrupe attended school at the Santiago Apostol High School in Bilbao. In 1923, he moved to Madrid to attend the Medical School of the Universidad Complutense. There he met Severo Ochoa, who later won the Nobel Prize in Medicine. One of his teachers was Juan Negrín, a pioneer in physiology, who would become Prime Minister of the Spanish Republic during the Civil War (1936–1939). Arrupe received the top prize in the first year anatomy course.

In 1926, Arrupe's father died. That summer he went on a pilgrimage to Lourdes with his four sisters. He later recounted his experience there in conversations with Jean-Claude Dietsch, S.J.

"For me Lourdes is the city of miracles. I stayed there for some three months. Being a medical student, I obtained permission to observe the work of the Office of Verification [of Miracles]. I was, thus, the witness of three miraculous cures from the very moment they took place in the midst of the faithful who were praying to the Virgin Mary, and then on through the medical verification that was carried out by the doctors who were atheists. This impressed me very much, because I had often heard my professors in Madrid, who also were atheists, speak of the "superstitions of Lourdes." There was born my vocation, in that atmosphere of both simplicity and grandeur at the feet of the Virgin Mary, midst the noisy insistent prayer of the pilgrims and the sweet murmurings of the river Gave."

Subsequent to these gathered findings, Arrupe decided not continue his medical studies. On 15 January 1927, he joined the Society of Jesus.

He was unable to pursue his studies for the priesthood in Spain because the Jesuits had been expelled by the Spanish Republican government (1931–1939), so he pursued his studies in the Netherlands and Belgium and at Saint Louis University School of Divinity in St. Marys, Kansas, where he was ordained in 1936. Arrupe then completed a doctorate in Medical Ethics.

== Assignment in Hiroshima, Japan ==
After his doctorate, Arrupe was sent to work as a missionary in Japan. His early years as missionary were very frustrating for him, with few Japanese converts. The surprise Japanese attack on the U.S. naval base at Pearl Harbor on 7 December 1941, widened the war. On 8 December Arrupe was celebrating Mass when Japanese authorities arrested and imprisoned him, on suspicion he was a spy. He expected to be executed. On Christmas Eve, Arrupe heard people gathering outside his cell door and he presumed he was about to be executed. However, the gathering was of fellow Catholics who had come to sing Christmas carols to him. Arrupe recalled that he burst into tears. Authorities subsequently released him, deciding he was no threat. He remained in Japan was appointed Jesuit superior and novice in 1942.

Arrupe was living in suburban Hiroshima when the when Americans dropped the atomic bomb in August 1945. He was one of eight Jesuits who were within the blast zone of the bomb. All eight survived the destruction, protected by a hillock which separated the novitiate from the center of Hiroshima. Arrupe described that event as "a permanent experience outside of history, engraved on my memory." Arrupe used his medical skills to help the wounded and the dying. The Jesuit novitiate was converted into a makeshift hospital, where between 150 and 200 people received care. Arrupe recalled, "The chapel, half destroyed, was overflowing with the wounded, who were lying on the floor very near to one another, suffering terribly, twisted with pain."

In 1958, Arrupe was appointed the first Jesuit provincial for Japan, a position he held until being elected Father General in 1965. Prior to being elected Father General, Arrupe visited Latin America, where he saw the region's extreme inequality. The strength of faith among the poor deeply impressed him.

== Superior General ==
At the thirty-first General Congregation of the Society of Jesus in 1965, Arrupe was elected twenty-eighth Superior General of the Jesuits, and served in that post until 1983. He was the second Basque to be Father General, the first being the founder Ignatius of Loyola himself. Jesuit Vincent O'Keefe, a friend and advisor to Arrupe, said Arrupe was "a second Ignatius of Loyola, a refounder of the Society in the light of Vatican II." At his election, Moscow Radio spoke of an unusual man who would bring the Society of Jesus to its powers of the past.

After the changes following Vatican II (1962–1965), there was tension within the Society as to how the life of a Jesuit was to be lived. While some religious groups in the Catholic church have limits on the works they take on, the Society of Jesus encourages its members to follow their interest and talents and the needs of the times into a whole range of ministries – as theologians, missionaries, retreat directors, teachers, artists, writers, musicians, counselors, scientists, and pastors – to bring glory to God in all areas of human endeavor. This is in line with the crowning contemplation of Ignatius' Spiritual Exercises through which Jesuits learn to find God in all things (#236). As Arrupe's biographer said of him, he "saw the hand of God in everything."

Arrupe warned of repeating the answers of yesterday for tomorrow's problems, saying: "If we speak a language no longer appropriate to the hearts of people, we speak only to ourselves because no one will listen to us or try to understand what we say." Arrupe was "hailed as a prophet of our time", not unlike Jesuit Pope Francis, who was undertaking theological studies, learning, when Arrupe became Superior General and began speaking his "prophetic" words. The Union of Superior Generals of religious, seeing Arrupe as the right man for our time, elected him five times as their president.

=== Faith and justice ===
In an address to Jesuit alumni in 1973, Arrupe coined the phrase "men for others" which has become a theme for Jesuit education worldwide, educating students to be "men and women for others".

At the thirty-second General Congregation which convened in 1975, Arrupe's dream of working for the poor was crystallised in the document "Our Mission Today: the Service of Faith and the Promotion of Justice." It stated: "Our faith in Jesus Christ and our mission to proclaim the Gospel demand of us a commitment to promote justice and enter into solidarity with the voiceless and the powerless." Thus, the decree basically defined all the work of the Jesuits as having an essential focus on the promotion of social justice as well as the Catholic faith. Arrupe was keenly aware that in the political climate of the 1970s, the Jesuits’ commitment to working for social justice would bring great hardship and suffering, particularly in those Latin American countries ruled by military juntas.

In a speech to European educators Arrupe made it clear where he stood on matters of faith and justice, saying: "I take very seriously the words of Gandhi, 'I love Christ but I despise Christians because they do not live as Christ lived.' Without a doubt Christian love of neighbor entails a duty to care for the wounds of those that have fallen victim to robbers and are left bleeding by the wayside." In the late 1960s and into the 1980s some theologians in Latin America became increasingly involved in the political sphere, adopting Marxist rhetoric. Many Jesuits were at the forefront of the movement which was called liberation theology and concentrated on seeing Christ as the liberator not only from sin but from all forms of oppression. In its extreme manifestations, liberation theology seemed to subordinate the message of the Gospel to political revolution, with a wholesale acceptance of Marxism. But Arrupe's strong support for relieving the burden of the poor in Latin America enables one to see his "cautionary statements about liberation theology, as efforts to impose self-discipline to fend off more severe sanctions from outside the order."

=== A cause worth dying for ===
On 20 June 1977 the White Warriors Union death squad threatened to kill all 47 Jesuits serving in El Salvador unless they abandoned their work with the poor and left the country within a month. After consulting with the Jesuit community in El Salvador, Arrupe replied "They may end up as martyrs, but my priests are not going to leave because they are with the people." A few months earlier, Jesuit Rutilio Grande, a proponent of liberation theology, was assassinated in El Salvador. On 16 November 1989, six Jesuits (Ignacio Ellacuría, Armando Lopez, Joaquin Lopez y Lopez, Ignacio Martín-Baró, Segundo Montes and Juan Ramon Moreno, along with their housekeeper (Julia Elba Ramos) and her daughter (Celina), would be murdered at the Jesuit University of Central America. Others also suffered martyrdom: the chief bishop in El Salvador Archbishop Óscar Romero (who, in keeping with his longstanding commitment to Catholic social teaching, became increasingly concerned with the plight of the poor and marginalized) was gunned down whilst celebrating the Eucharist on 24 March 1980. Lay missionary Jean Donovan, Ursuline sister Dorothy Kazel and Maryknoll sisters Maura Clarke and Ita Ford were beaten, raped and murdered by non-uniformed members of the Salvadoran National Guard on 2 December 1980. They joined some 75,000 Salvadorans who were killed during this troubled period. All the while, Arrupe continued to support and pray for those people who were willing to lay down their lives to help the poor initiate change.

=== Jesuit Refugee Service ===
Touched by the plight of the "Vietnamese boat people" in 1979, Pedro Arrupe sent cable messages to some 20 Jesuit major superiors throughout the world sharing his distress at the suffering of these people. He asked them what they could do to help bring relief to refugees and displaced persons in their own regions. He received a positive response, with numerous offers of personnel, medicine, and funding. The following year in 1980, Arrupe founded the Jesuit Refugee Service to coordinate the Society's refugee work. In a speech launching the service he said "Saint Ignatius called us to go anywhere where we are most needed for the greater glory of God. The spiritual as well as the material need of more than 16 million refugees throughout the world today could scarcely be greater. God is calling us through these helpless people." In 2017, JRS listed 47 countries where its 10 regional offices were currently serving nearly 950,000 individuals. Over the years JRS had served an estimated 40 million refugees.

== Later life ==
On 7 August 1981, after a long and tiring trip throughout the Far East, Arrupe suffered a stroke just after his plane landed at Rome's Fiumicino Airport. He was paralysed on his right side and was able to speak only a few words. This ability gradually deteriorated until he was completely mute. From that time on he lived in the infirmary at the Jesuit headquarters in Rome. He then became the first-ever Jesuit superior general to resign. Pope John Paul II appointed Paolo Dezza as his personal delegate and interim Father General of the Society, passing over Arrupe's own choice (his vicar general). Many Jesuits saw this as an unwarranted papal interference in Jesuit affairs. For his part, Arrupe never expressed any disagreement or resentment. Jesuit disobedience to the pope that was expected by some at the Roman Curia never came about. With new respect for the Jesuits, Pope John Paul allowed Dezza to call the thirty-third General Congregation and elect a successor to Arrupe, whose resignation was accepted on 3 September 1983 during the Congregation. He was succeeded by Peter Hans Kolvenbach. During the opening Session of the Congregation, Arrupe was wheeled into the hall, and a prayer which he had written was read aloud:

"More than ever I find myself in the hands of God. This is what I have wanted all my life from my youth. But now there is a difference; the initiative is entirely with God. It is indeed a profound spiritual experience to know and feel myself so totally in God's hands."

During his ten years in the infirmary, Arrupe received many and frequent well-wishers, including Pope John Paul II. Arrupe had earlier expressed what some regard as the key to his life: "Nowadays the world does not need words but lives that cannot be explained except through faith and love for Christ's poor."

=== Death and burial ===
Arrupe died at 7:45pm on 5 February 1991, the anniversary of the 26 Martyrs of Japan. His final words had been: "For the present, Amen; for the future, Alleluia."

His funeral was held in the Church of the Gesu, Rome, on February 9 and was attended by crowds that filled the piazza outside the church. Also in attendance were 10 cardinals, 20 bishops, Giulio Andreotti (the Prime Minister of Italy), as well as other religious and civil dignitaries. His body, first interred in the Jesuit mausoleum at Campo Verano, was brought back into the Church of the Gesù where it currently lies in a side chapel.

== Beatification process ==
On 11 July 2018, the Father General of the Society of Jesus, Arturo Sosa, announced the beginning of Arrupe's beatification process by the Diocese of Rome. On 14 November 2018, a website was established with testimonials and archival material on his life. On 14 November 2024, Cardinal-elect Baldassare Reina presided over the diocesan tribunal's termination of its inquiry at the Lateran Palace. The Dicastery for the Causes of Saints will next determine whether Arrupe should be declared Venerable.

== Memorials ==
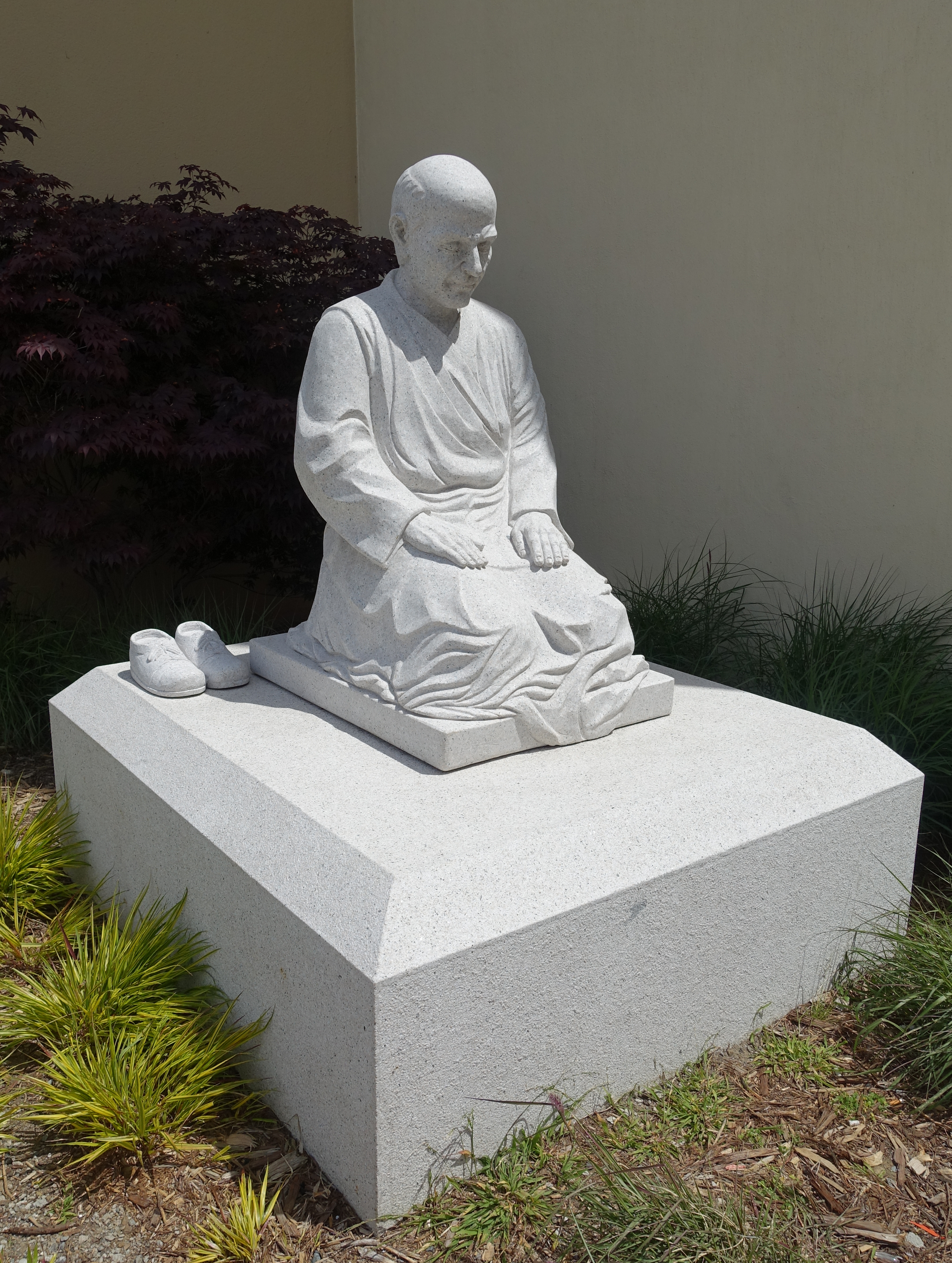
Pedro Arrupe memorial at University of San Francisco, California, United States.

Numerous Jesuit buildings, schools, communities, institutions, and programs have been named after Pedro Arrupe. They include:

- The Arrupe Center for Community Service & Social Responsibility at Marquette University
- The Colégio de Pedro Arrupe, a private school in Portugal dedicated to Arrupe which opened in 2009.
- The Arrupe Program of the Australian Province of the Society of Jesus for the formation of Givers of the Ignatian Spiritual Exercises and Spiritual Directors in the Ignatian tradition.
- The Sports hall in Wimbledon College, London.
- The Pedro Arrupe Center for Business Ethics at Saint Joseph's University in Philadelphia
- A residence hall at the University of San Francisco
- Arrupe Hall at Fairfield College Preparatory School, Connecticut
- The Arrupe House at the University of Scranton
- The Fr. Pedro Arrupe Campus Ministry Center at Fairfield University
- The main auditorium at the ITESO, a Jesuit university in Guadalajara, Mexico
- The middle school of Boston College High School, was named the "Arrupe Division" in 2007.
- Arrupe Jesuit University – AJU Harare, Zimbabwe
- A Jesuit Volunteer Corps house in Santa Clara, California, is named Casa Pedro Arrupe
- A school in the Philippines, the Pedro Arrupe Academy.
- The neighbourhood partnership program named the Arrupe House at Saint Ignatius High School in Cleveland, Ohio
- The "Arrupe Scholars" scholarship program at John Carroll University, Cleveland, Ohio
- A building in Pontifical Xavierian University in Bogotá, Colombia
- A class taken by Seniors at Creighton Preparatory School in Omaha, Nebraska, called the "Arrupe Experience Service Class" where the students make service trips every other day to local schools
- The Fr. Pedro Arrupe S.J. Office of Faith and Justice serves the students of Brophy College Preparatory by organizing service trips, immersion experiences, retreats, the annual Summit on Human Dignity, and much more.
- Arrupe College of Loyola University Chicago's Water Tower Campus is a 2-year college designed to serve underrepresented and underserved students. On their Lake Shore Campus, one of the Jesuit Community Houses is named Arrupe House, but has no direct tie to Arrupe College.
- Jesuit High School in Portland, Oregon has its History, English and Library building named after Pedro Arrupe.
- A residence hall at Loyola University Maryland, Baltimore, Maryland.
- A building in the Saint Louis University, Madrid Campus, called Padre Arrupe Hall
- The Arrupe Office of Social Formation of the Ateneo de Davao University, Davao City, Philippines
- A building on the campus of Rockhurst University in Kansas City, Missouri, called Pedro Arrupe, SJ, Hall which opened in 2015
- A residence hall at Georgetown University in Washington, D.C., called Pedro Arrupe, S.J. Hall, which was opened in August 2016
- Arrupe International Residence at the Ateneo de Manila University, Quezon City, Philippines
- The Pedro Arrupe Footbridge in Bilbao, Spain links the Guggenheim museum to the University of Deusto.
- Pedro Arrupe Human Rights Institute, an academic institution attached to the University of Deusto in Bilbao
- Arrupe Etxea, a civilian foundation initially covering all the social and pastoral activity of the jesuits in Bilbao and, since 2014, also San Sebastián, Vitoria-Gasteiz and Pamplona
- The Pedro Arrupe Centre, a multipurpose hall, and The Arrupe Building, a block of classrooms, at Jesuit school St. Aloysius' College, in Sydney, Australia
- Arrupe Hall at Sogang University, Seoul, South Korea
- Pedro Arrupe Auditorium at Carlos Pereyra School, Torreón, Mexico
- Arrupe Global Scholars Program, an MD-MPH combined degree program at the Creighton University School of Medicine, for students dedicated to global health
- Arrupe library at St Joseph's college Tiruchirappalli
- FACES: Father [Pedro] Arrupe {SJ} Centre for Ecology and Sustainability, at XLRI – Xavier School of Management, Jamshedpur, India, the first B-School in India, founded in 1949
- ATCC: Arrupe Tribal Cultural Centre, Bhognadih, Sahebganj Dt, Jharkhand State, India.

== Gallery ==
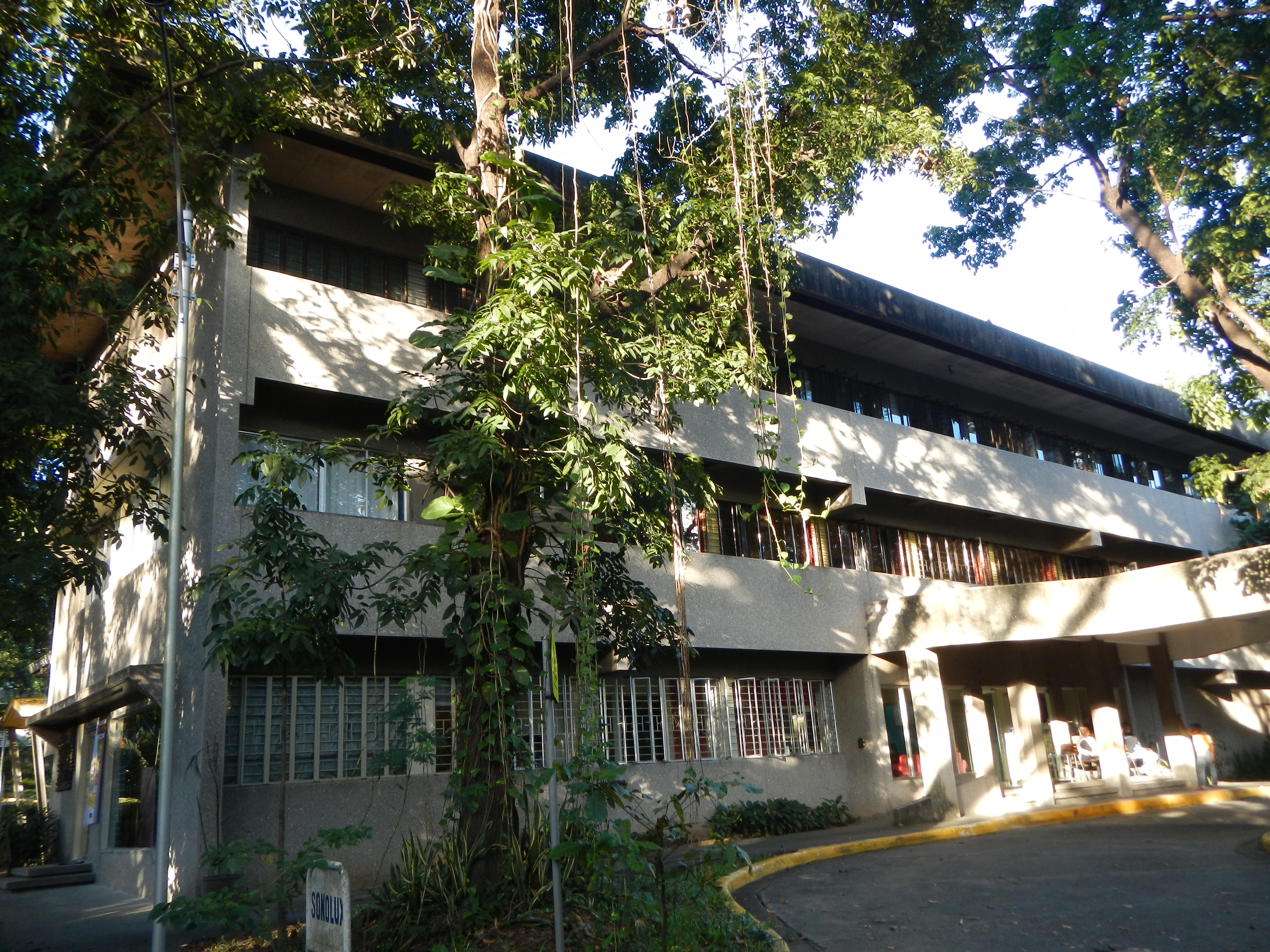
Arrupe International Residence at Ateneo de Manila University

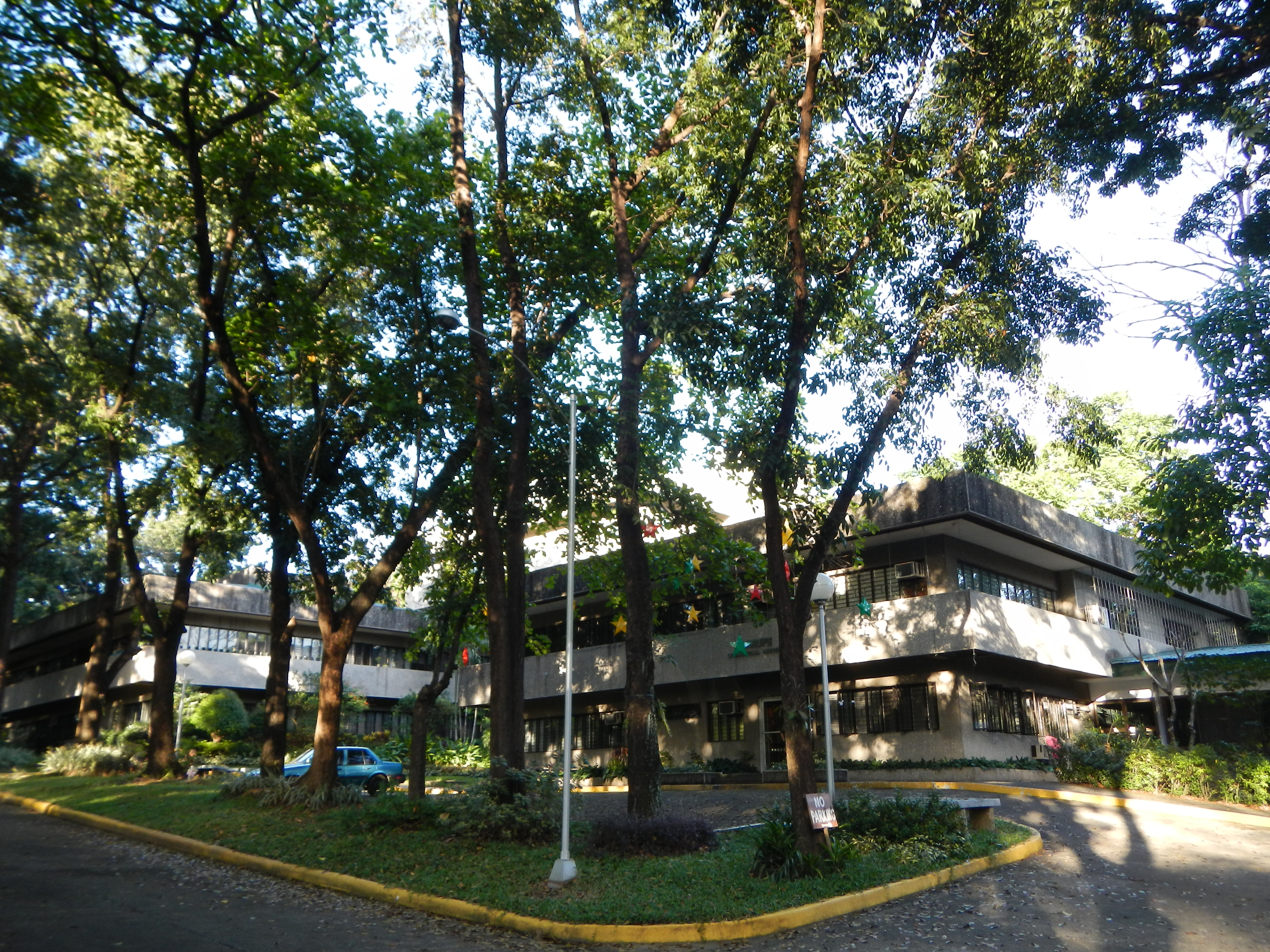
Entrance to Residence at Ateneo

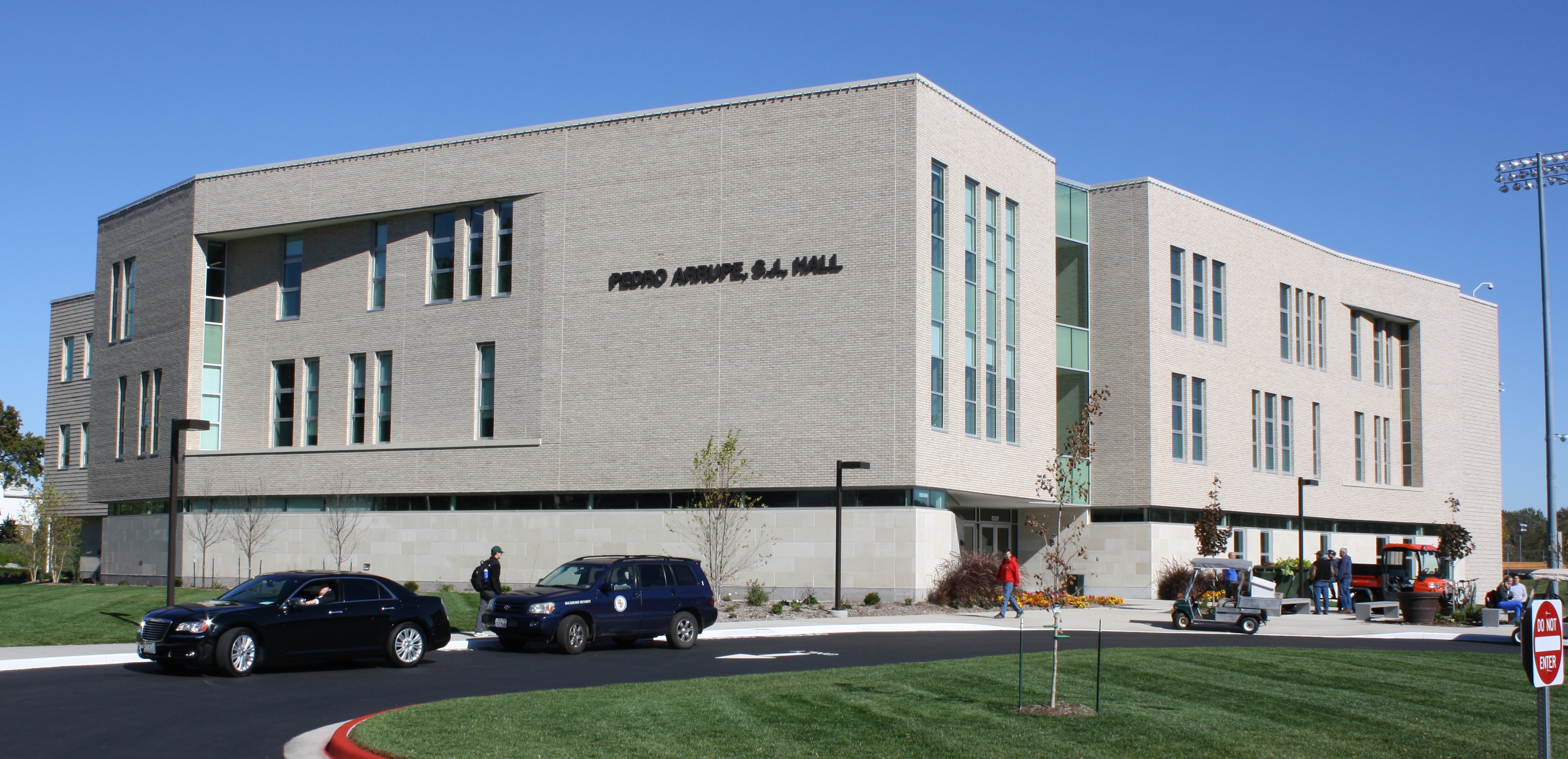
Pedro Arrupe, S.J., Hall, Rockhurst University, Kansas City, Missouri, USA

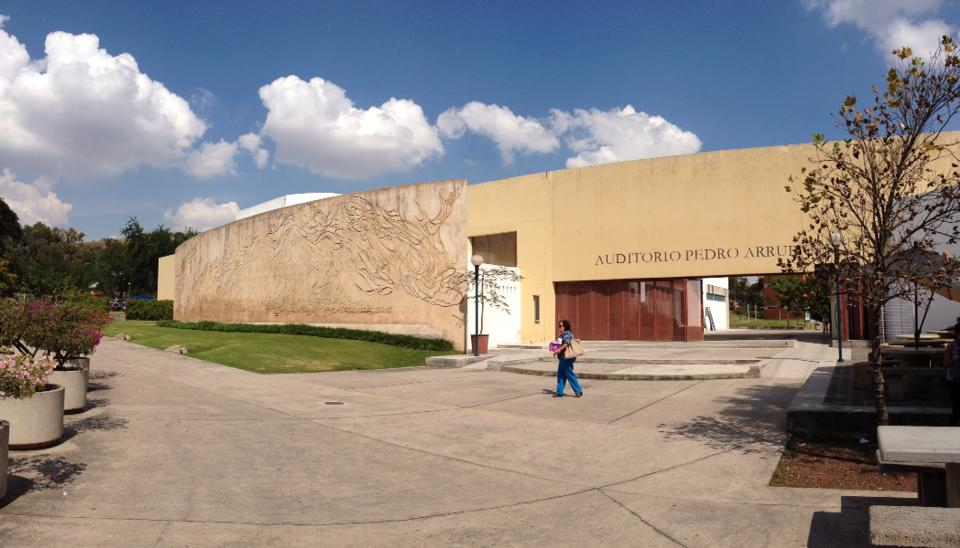
Arrupe Auditorio, Instituto Tecnológico, Guadalajara, Mexico

Catholic Church titles
Preceded by Jean-Baptiste Janssens	Superior General of the Society of Jesus; 1965–1983	Succeeded by Peter Hans Kolvenbach
