= Arturo Sosa =

Venezuelan priest (born 1948)

The Very Reverend Arturo Marcelino Sosa Abascal SJ
- Superior General of the Society of Jesus
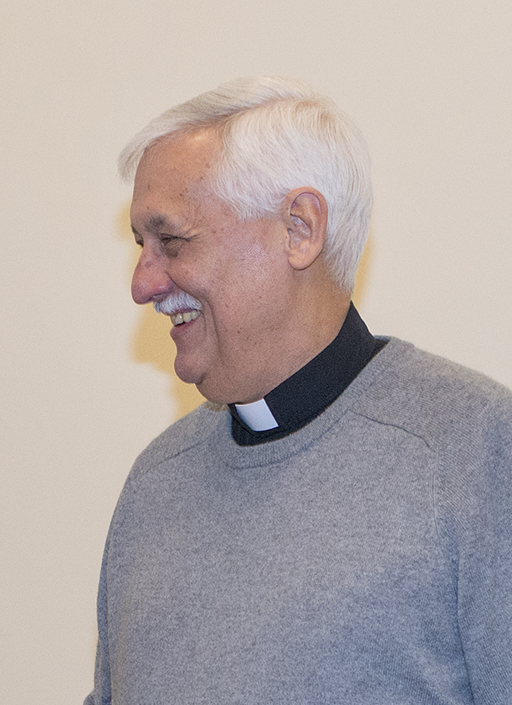
- Sosa in January 2017
- Installed: 14 October 2016
- Predecessor: Adolfo Nicolás

Orders
- Ordination: 30 July 1977

Personal details
- Born: Arturo Marcelino Sosa Abascal; 12 November 1948 (age 77) Caracas, Venezuela
- Education: Universidad Católica Andrés Bello (LTh); Universidad Central de Venezuela (PhD)

Arturo Marcelino Sosa Abascal (born 12 November 1948) is a Venezuelan Catholic priest who has served as the 31st superior general of the Society of Jesus since 2016. He was elected by the Society's 36th General Congregation to succeed Adolfo Nicolás. He is the first person born in Latin America to lead the Jesuits.

== Early life and education ==
Arturo Marcelino Sosa Abascal was born in Caracas, Venezuela, on 12 November 1948, the son of Arturo Sosa, Sr. a prestigious businessman who served twice as finance minister in 1958 and 1982. He entered the Society of Jesus in 1966 and was ordained to the priesthood in 1977. He earned a licentiate in philosophy from the Universidad Católica Andrés Bello in 1972, and a doctorate in political science from the Universidad Central de Venezuela in 1990.

== Priestly ministry ==
Sosa has held a number of academic appointments. He was a professor and member of the Council of the foundation for the Andrés Bello Catholic University, and rector of the Catholic University of Tachira, both Jesuit universities. He was also the Chair of Contemporary Political Theory and the Department of Social Change at the Faculty of Social Sciences in Venezuela. He published a number of works, mainly about the history and politics of Venezuela. He was also coordinator of the social apostolate and director of Centro Gumilla in Venezuela, a centre of research and social action for the Jesuits in Venezuela, as well as editor-in-chief of Revista SIC magazine for Catholic social ethics and politics from 1976 to 1996. In 2004, he was professor of Venezuelan political thinking at the Catholic University of Tachira and was invited to Georgetown University Center for Latin American Studies as a visiting professor to give a lecture.

Between 1996 and 2004, Sosa was Provincial Superior of the Jesuits in Venezuela. During the 35th General Congregation in 2008, he was appointed Counselor General by then-Superior General Adolfo Nicolás. In 2014, he joined the General Curia of the Society of Jesus in Rome as Delegate for Interprovincial Roman Houses of the Society of Jesus in Rome, which include institutions such as the Pontifical Gregorian University, the Pontifical Biblical Institute, the Pontifical Oriental Institute, the Vatican Observatory, and La Civiltà Cattolica.

Sosa speaks Spanish, Italian and English, and understands French.

== Superior General of the Society of Jesus ==
On 14 October 2016, during the thirty-sixth General Congregation of the Society of Jesus, the assembly elected Sosa as the Order's thirty-first Superior General to succeed Adolfo Nicolás. He became the first Latin American to head the Jesuits. In his first address as Superior General, he said that Jesuits should look for "alternatives to overcome poverty, inequality and oppression" and also to collaborate with others "inside and outside the Church".

In 2017, in a visit to the Jesuit mission in Cambodia, Sosa met with a group of Buddhist monks in the Buddhist-majority country. In 2018, commenting on the Fifteenth Ordinary General Assembly of the Synod of Bishops, Sosa spoke of secularization, saying "What if we try, instead, to look at secularization as a sign of the times, in the theological sense that the Second Vatican Council gave to this expression? It means looking at secularization, and the secular world that arises from it, as one of the ways the Spirit is speaking to us and guiding us in this time."

In February 2019, after guiding Jesuits and their lay collaborators through two years of discernment, Sosa announced four priorities that would guide the Society's decisions for the next decade. These were: teaching discernment through use of the Spiritual Exercises, walking with the poor in their quest for dignity and justice, accompany young people in the creation of a hope-filled future, and collaborating in the care of our Common Home. Pope Francis declared these priorities to be very much in line with those of his pontificate.

== Criticism ==
The Catholic Herald criticised Sosa for being one of over 1,000 signatories of a 1989 letter welcoming Cuban dictator Fidel Castro to Venezuela in 1989, Castro having repressed the Catholic Church in Cuba during his time in power. George Neumayr of the conservative American Spectator described Sosa as a "Marxist", "a Venezuelan communist, and modernist".

In February 2017, in response to Cardinal Müller's argument that permitting the reception of Communion by the remarried contradicts Jesus's words in the Bible that marriage is indissoluble and Müller's insistence that those words are unchangeable, Sosa argued for a "reflection on what Jesus really said", and described the Gospel as "relative", being "written by human beings" and "accepted by [...] human beings". Sosa also argued that the doctrine of the Church is in "continuous development", and "never in white and black". Sosa's remarks drew criticism in the Italian media.

The English priest and consulting editor of The Catholic Herald Alexander Lucie-Smith disagreed with Sosa, arguing that the Church's teaching on the indissolubility of marriage has been historically consistent, and that there was no precedent set in the Bible to interpret these words otherwise. Theologian Chad Pecknold criticised Sosa's views as "reflect[ing] a profound skepticism about Holy Scripture", countering that although a variety of interpretations are allowed, they must "fit with the established doctrine of the Church and do not contradict the deposit of the Faith". Contradicting Sosa's own claim that his views were "not relativism", Pecknold characterised Sosa's remarks as "historicist relativizing".

Catholic author Vittorio Messori accused Sosa of "'liquefying' the Gospel itself" by suggesting that the Gospel should be adapted according to the times on the basis that Jesus's words were not recorded verbatim or "on tape".

In June 2017, in an interview with El Mundo, Sosa said, "We have formed symbolic figures such as the devil to express evil. Social conditioning can also represent this figure, since there are people who act [in an evil way] because they are in an environment where it is difficult to act to the contrary". This was criticised as contradicting the Catechism of the Catholic Church which teaches that the Devil is a real creature. A spokesman for Sosa later argued that Sosa was not denying church teaching, saying, "to say the devil symbolizes evil is not to deny the existence of the devil." On 21 August 2019, Sosa declared in an interview that the Devil "exists as the personification of evil in different structures, but not in persons, because [he] is not a person, [he] is a way of acting evil. He is not a person like a human person. It is a way of evil to be present in human life. [...] Good and evil are in a permanent war in the human conscience and we have ways to point them out. We recognize God as good, fully good. Symbols are part of reality, and the devil exists as a symbolic reality, not as a personal reality." The Catholic World Report criticized these declarations, saying they were contrary to the catechism, and reminded of the controversy of the June 2017 statement of Sosa concerning the Devil.

In October 2018, in an interview with Eternal Word Television Network, Sosa argued that "the pope is not the chief of the Church, he's the Bishop of Rome". This was opposed by Chad Pecknold, Associate Professor of Theology at the Catholic University of America, who argued that it would be wrong to believe that Pope was "merely 'first among equals'", and insisted that the pope has "supreme authority" over all bishops and the faithful.

== Publications ==
Sosa has authored about a dozen books on politics and on the history of Venezuela, including:

- Arturo Sosa, La filosofía política del gomecismo: Estudio del pensamiento by Laureano Vallenilla Lanz, Barquisimeto, Centro Gumilla,1974, 130 p. (ISBN 8439920830)
- Arturo Sosa and Eloi Lengrand, Del garibaldismo student to the izquierda criolla: Los orígenes marxistas del proyecto de AD (1928-1935), Caracas, Centauro, 1981, 517 ppp. (OCLC 30449576)
- Arturo Sosa, Ensayos sobre el pensamiento político positivista venezolano, Caracas, Centauro,1985, 269 pp. (ISBN 9802630217)
- Arturo Sosa, Rómulo Betancourt y el Partido del Pueblo, 1937-1941, Caracas, Fundación Rómulo Betancourt, coll. "Vigente Tiempo" (No. 9) 1995, 617 pp. (ISBN 9806191293)

Catholic Church titles
Preceded by Adolfo Nicolás	Superior General of the Society of Jesus; 2016–present	Incumbent
