= Superior general of the Society of Jesus =

Leader of the Society of Jesus

Superior General of the Society of Jesus
- Praepositus Generalis
- Seal of the Society of Jesus

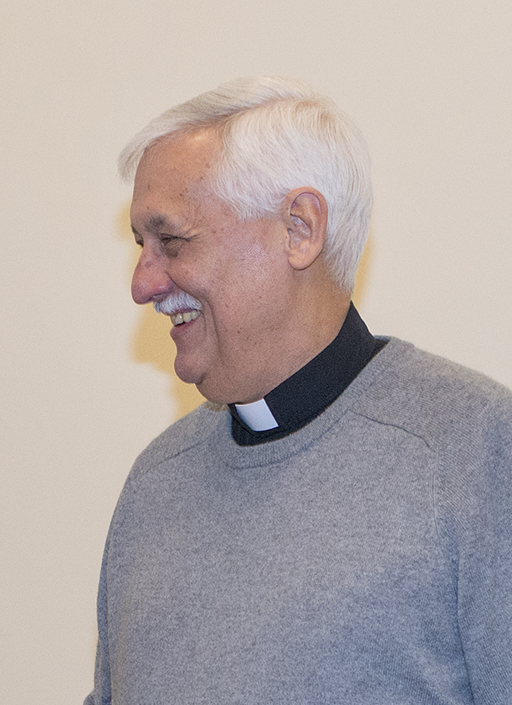
- Incumbent; Arturo Sosa since 14 October 2016
- Formation: 19 April 1541
- First holder: Ignatius of Loyola

The superior general of the Society of Jesus is the leader of the Society of Jesus, the Catholic religious order also known as the Jesuits. He is generally addressed as Father General. The position sometimes carries the nickname of the black pope. The thirty-first and current superior general is Fr Arturo Sosa, elected by the 36th General Congregation on 14 October 2016.

== Titles ==
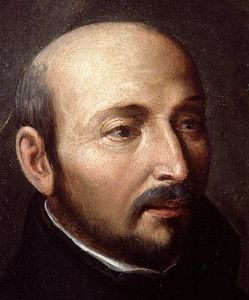
Ignatius of Loyola, first Superior General

The formal title in Latin is Praepositus Generalis, which may fairly be rendered as "superior general" or even, "president general". The term is like that of military usage (and Ignatius of Loyola had a military background) which is derived from "general", as opposed to "particular". This usage is consistent with other Catholic religious orders, like the Dominicans' "master general", Franciscans' "minister general", Carthusians' "prior general", and with civil posts such as Postmaster General and Attorney General. The Jesuits are organized into provinces, each with a provincial superior, (usually referred to as the "Father Provincial" or just "Provincial"), with the head of the order being the "general superior", for the whole organization. As a major superior, the Superior General is styled "Very Reverend".

== Black pope ==
"Black pope" is an unofficial designation given to the position of Superior General of the Order of the Jesuits, which are the largest Catholic, male religious order. The name follows from the colour of the plain black cassock worn by members of the Society, including the Superior General, in contrast with the white garb of the pope. This may have originated from a past concern (most prominent around the 16th and 17th centuries) among Protestant European countries concerning the relative power of the Jesuits within the Roman Catholic Church, and partly because the Superior General, like the pope, is elected for life.

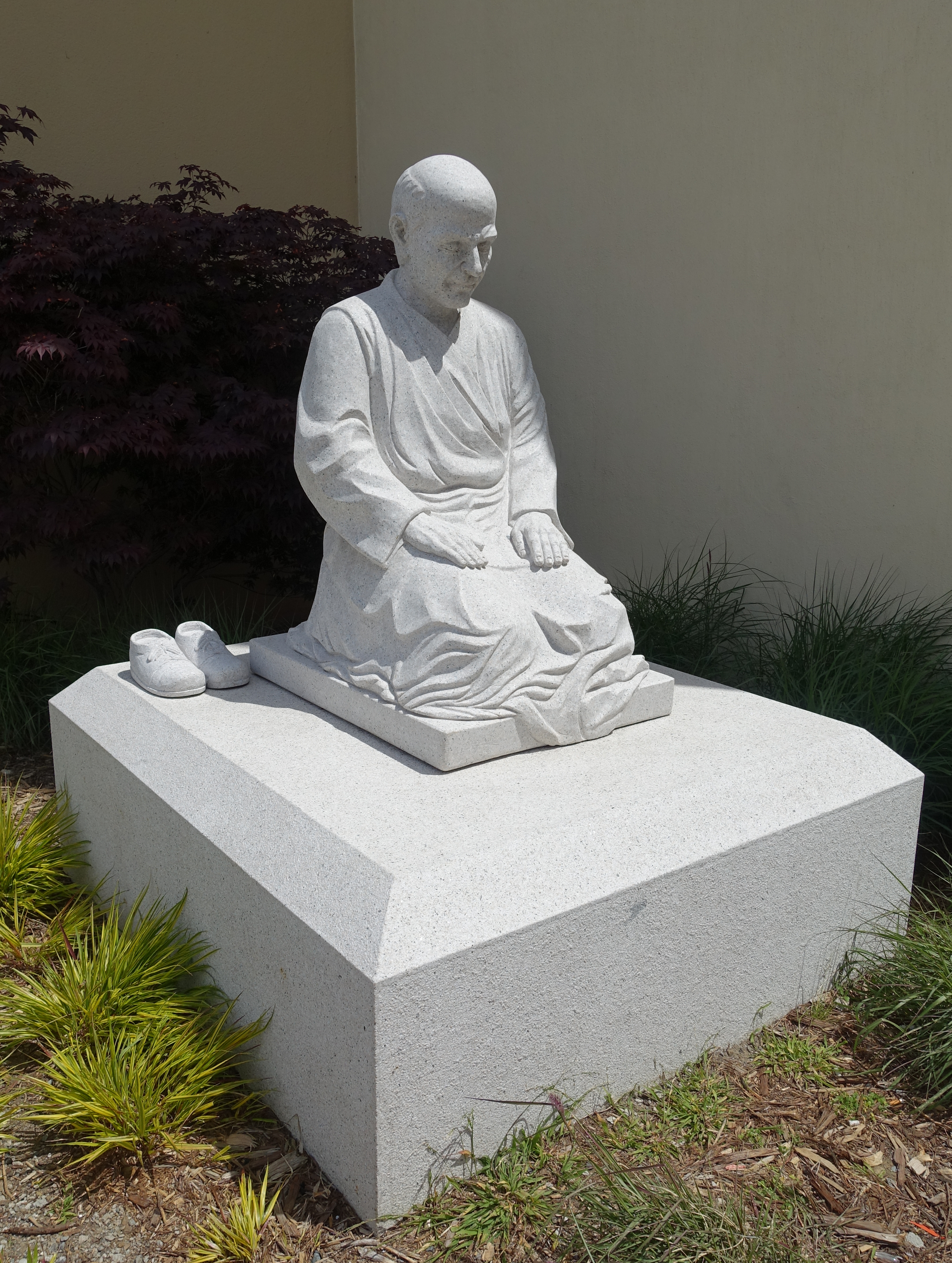
Pedro Arrupe

== Powers ==
The Superior General is invested with governing power over all the members of the Society, but customarily leads through Provincial superiors under him. Such power follows from the religious vows that bind members to community life, as in other religious orders.

== Succession ==
Superiors General are elected by the General Congregation of the Society, summoned upon the resignation or death of an incumbent. Superiors General are elected for life and up to recently, as with the popes, have served life terms. The exceptions being Father Pedro Arrupe (resigned for reasons of failing health) and both his successors, Father Peter Hans Kolvenbach and Father Adolfo Nicolás. On 2 October 2016, General Congregation 36 convened in Rome, convoked by Superior General Nicolás, and it elected Father Arturo Sosa as the thirty-first Superior General.

== List of Superiors General ==
Until the 21st century, it was customary for Superiors General to rule for life. Where they left office before death, the date of death is listed below the date they left office. (Pedro Arrupe resigned in 1983 after a paralyzing stroke.)

No.	Superior General	Portrait	Took office	Left office Deceased	Birthplace (Note: Lists the present-day name and nationality of the city in question.)	Duration (in days)
1	Ignatius of Loyola		April 19, 1541	July 31, 1556	Azpeitia, Spain	5,582
2	Diego Laynez		July 2, 1558	January 19, 1565	Almazán, Spain	2,393
3	Francis Borgia		July 2, 1565	October 1, 1572	Gandia, Spain	2,648
4	Everard Mercurian		April 23, 1573	August 1, 1580	La Roche-en-Ardenne, Belgium	2,657
5	Claudio Acquaviva		February 19, 1581	January 31, 1615	Atri, Italy	12,399
6	Mutio Vitelleschi		November 15, 1615	February 9, 1645	Rome, Italy	10,679
7	Vincenzo Carafa		January 7, 1646	June 8, 1649	Naples, Italy	1,248
8	Francesco Piccolomini		December 21, 1649	June 17, 1651	Siena, Italy	543
9	Aloysius Gottifredi		January 21, 1652	March 12, 1652	Rome, Italy	51
10	Goschwin Nickel		March 17, 1652	July 31, 1664	Jülich, Germany	4,519
11	Giovanni Paolo Oliva		July 31, 1664	November 26, 1681	Genoa, Italy	6,327
12	Charles de Noyelle		July 5, 1682	December 12, 1686	Brussels, Belgium	1,621
13	Thyrsus González de Santalla		July 6, 1687	October 27, 1705	Arganza, Spain	6,688
14	Michelangelo Tamburini		January 31, 1706	February 28, 1730	Modena, Italy	8,521
15	Franz Retz		March 7, 1730	November 19, 1750	Prague, Bohemia	7,562
16	Ignacio Visconti		July 4, 1751	May 4, 1755	Milan, Italy	1,389
17	Aloysius Centurione		November 30, 1755	October 2, 1757	Genoa, Italy	672
18	Lorenzo Ricci		May 21, 1758	August 16, 1773; 24 November 1775; 21 July 1773 (suppressed)	Florence, Italy	5,566
—	Stanislaus Czerniewicz (Note: Vicar General)		October 17, 1782	October 21, 1785	Kaunas, Polish–Lithuanian Commonwealth	1,100
—	Gabriel Lenkiewicz		October 8, 1785	October 21, 1798	Polotsk, Polish–Lithuanian Commonwealth	4,761
—	Franciszek Kareu (Note: Vicar General until 7 March 1801, Superior General for Russia thereafter.)		February 12, 1799	August 11, 1802	Orsha, Polish–Lithuanian Commonwealth	1,275
—	Gabriel Gruber (Note: Superior General for Russia only.)		October 22, 1802	April 6, 1805	Vienna, Austria	897
19	Tadeusz Brzozowski (Note: Superior General for Russia only from 14 September 1805 to 7 August 1814.)		August 7, 1814	February 5, 1820	Königsberg, Prussia	2,008
20	Luigi Fortis		October 18, 1820	January 27, 1829	Verona, Italy	3,023
21	Jan Roothaan		July 9, 1829	May 8, 1853	Amsterdam, Netherlands	8,704
22	Peter Jan Beckx		August 2, 1853	March 4, 1887	Scherpenheuvel-Zichem, Belgium	12,267
23	Anton Anderledy		March 4, 1887	January 18, 1892	Berisal, Switzerland	1,781
24	Luis Martín		October 2, 1892	April 18, 1906	Melgar de Fernamental, Spain	4,945
25	Franz Xavier Wernz		September 8, 1906	August 20, 1914	Rottweil, Germany	2,903
26	Wlodimir Ledóchowski		February 11, 1915	December 13, 1942	Loosdorf, Austria	10,167
27	Jean-Baptiste Janssens		September 15, 1946	October 5, 1964	Mechelen, Belgium	6,595
28	Pedro Arrupe		May 22, 1965	September 3, 1983; 5 February 1991	Bilbao, Spain	6,678
29	Peter Hans Kolvenbach		September 13, 1983	January 14, 2008; 26 November 2016	Druten, Netherlands	8,889
30	Adolfo Nicolás		January 19, 2008	October 3, 2016; 20 May 2020	Villamuriel de Cerrato, Spain	3,169
31	Arturo Sosa		October 14, 2016	Incumbent	Caracas, Venezuela	3,670

== Leadership during suppression ==
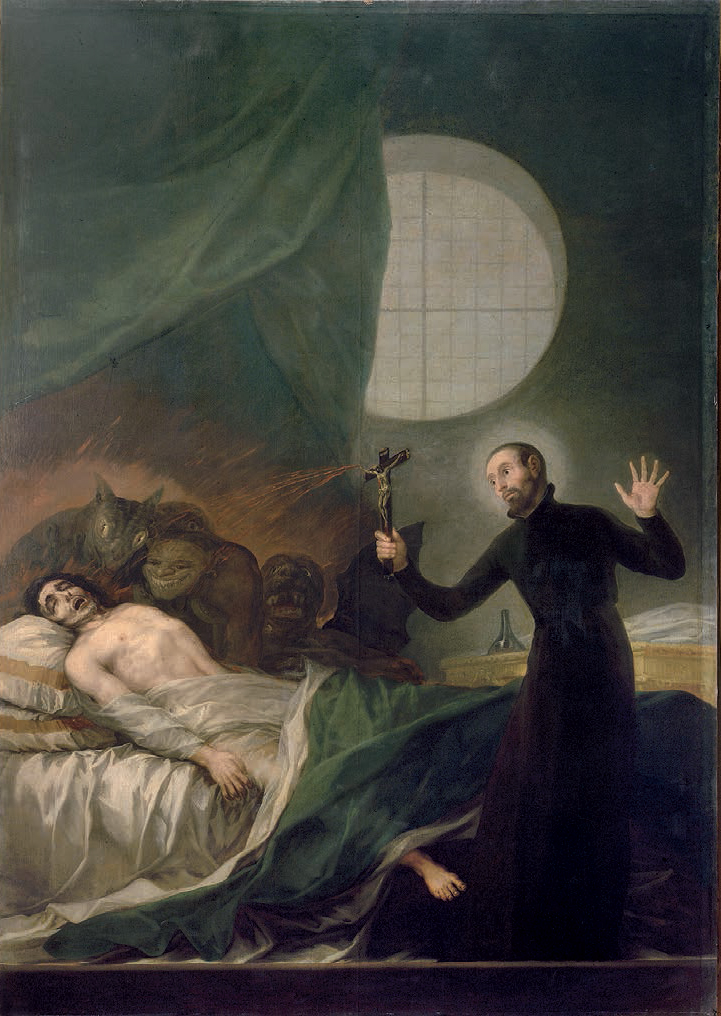
Saint Francis Borgia, depicted performing an exorcism, served as the third Superior General.

In 1773, the Jesuits were suppressed by Pope Clement XIV, through the Papal brief Dominus ac Redemptor on 21 July 1773, executed 16 August. The leaders of the order, in the nations where the Papal suppression order was not enforced, were known as temporary Vicars General.

The temporary Vicars General were:

- Stanislaus Czerniewicz (17 October 1782 – 21 October 1785)
- Gabriel Lenkiewicz (8 October 1785 – 21 October 1798)
- Franciszek Kareu (12 February 1799 – 7 March 1801)

On 7 March 1801, Pope Pius VII issued the brief Catholicae fidei, giving approval to the existence of the Society in Russia and allowing the Society there to elect a Superior General for Russia. This was the first step to the Society's eventual restoration.

The Superiors General in Russia were:

- Franciszek Kareu (7 March 1801 – 11 August 1802)
- Gabriel Gruber (22 October 1802 – 6 April 1805)
- Tadeusz Brzozowski (14 September 1805 – 7 August 1814)

The order was restored on 7 August 1814, by Pope Pius VII, through the papal bull Sollicitudo omnium ecclesiarum.

== See also ==
- Admonitor (Jesuits)
