= General Congregation =

Representative assembly of the Society of Jesus

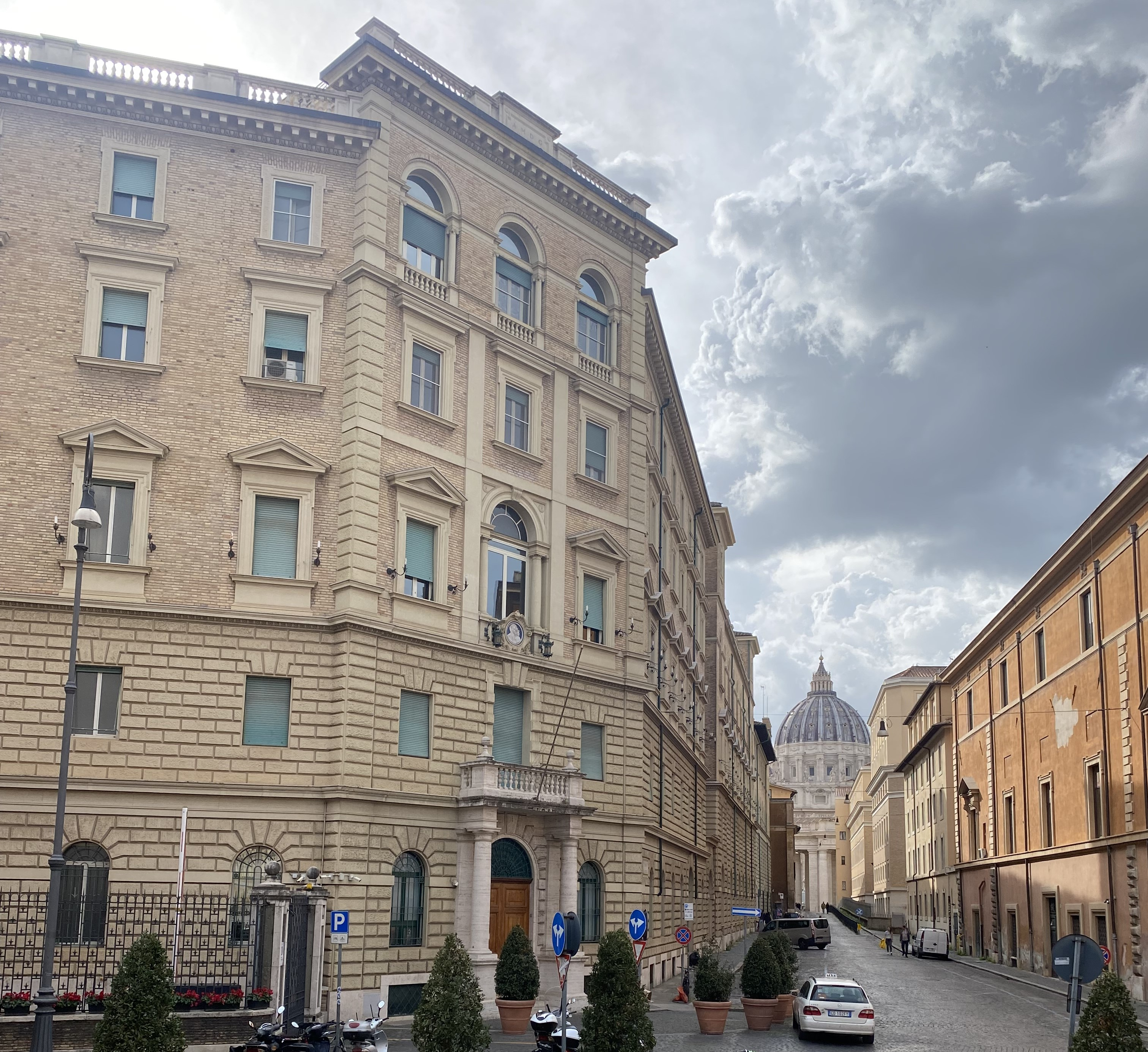
Building of the General Curia of the Jesuit order on Borgo Santo Spirito in Rome, with the dome of St. Peter's Basilica in the background

The General Congregation is an assembly of the Jesuit representatives from all parts of the world, and serves as the highest authority in the Society of Jesus. A General Congregation (GC) is always summoned on the death or resignation of the administrative head of the order, called the Superior General or Father General, to choose his successor, and it may be called at other times if circumstances warrant. A smaller congregation of worldwide representatives meets every three years to discuss internal business and to decide the need for a general congregation.

== Congregations ==
Through its four-century history, the Society has convened 36 general congregations.

=== First General Congregation ===
The first General Congregation took place in 1558, when Father Diego Laynez was elected Superior General. It had been delayed for two years after St. Ignatius’ death because of a war between King Philip II of Spain and Pope Paul IV.

=== General Congregation 5 ===
General Congregation 5 took place in 1593-4. A decree was issued preventing people of Jewish or Muslim ancestry from becoming Jesuits. This decree was formally abrogated by the 29th General Congregation in 1946.

=== General Congregation 11 ===
General Congregation 11 took place in 1661. The case of Baldassare Diego Loyola, a Moroccan prince who had converted to Christianity and wanted to become a Jesuit, was discussed during this congregation. An exception was made and he was allowed to become a Jesuit priest despite being a former Muslim.

=== Jesuit Congregations during the Suppression ===
During the period between the universal suppression of the Society of Jesus (from 1773) until its restoration in 1814 Jesuit Congregations occurred in Russian domains, where Catherine the Great had refused to publish the Papal Brief of Suppression. These Congregations are numbered separately from the other General Congregations, with John W. Padberg, S.J. calling them the "Polish Congregations".

- Polish Congregation 1 (10 October 1782 - 18 October 1782)
- Polish Congregation 2 (1 October 1785 - 13 October 1785)
- Polish Congregation 3 (7 February 1799 - 15 February 1799)
- Polish Congregation 4 (15 October 1802 - 25 October 1802)
- Polish Congregation 5 (8 September 1805 - 19 September 1805)

=== General Congregation 22 ===
General Congregation 22 was held in June 1853. The Belgian priest Peter Jan Beckx was elected as Superior-General.

=== General Congregation 23 ===
General Congregation 23 took place in Florence in 1893. Decree 46 declared that "the Society of Jesus accepts and receives with an overflowing spirit of joy and gratitude the most agreeable duty entrusted to it by our Lord Jesus Christ to practise, promote and propagate devotion to his divine heart".

=== General Congregation 27 ===
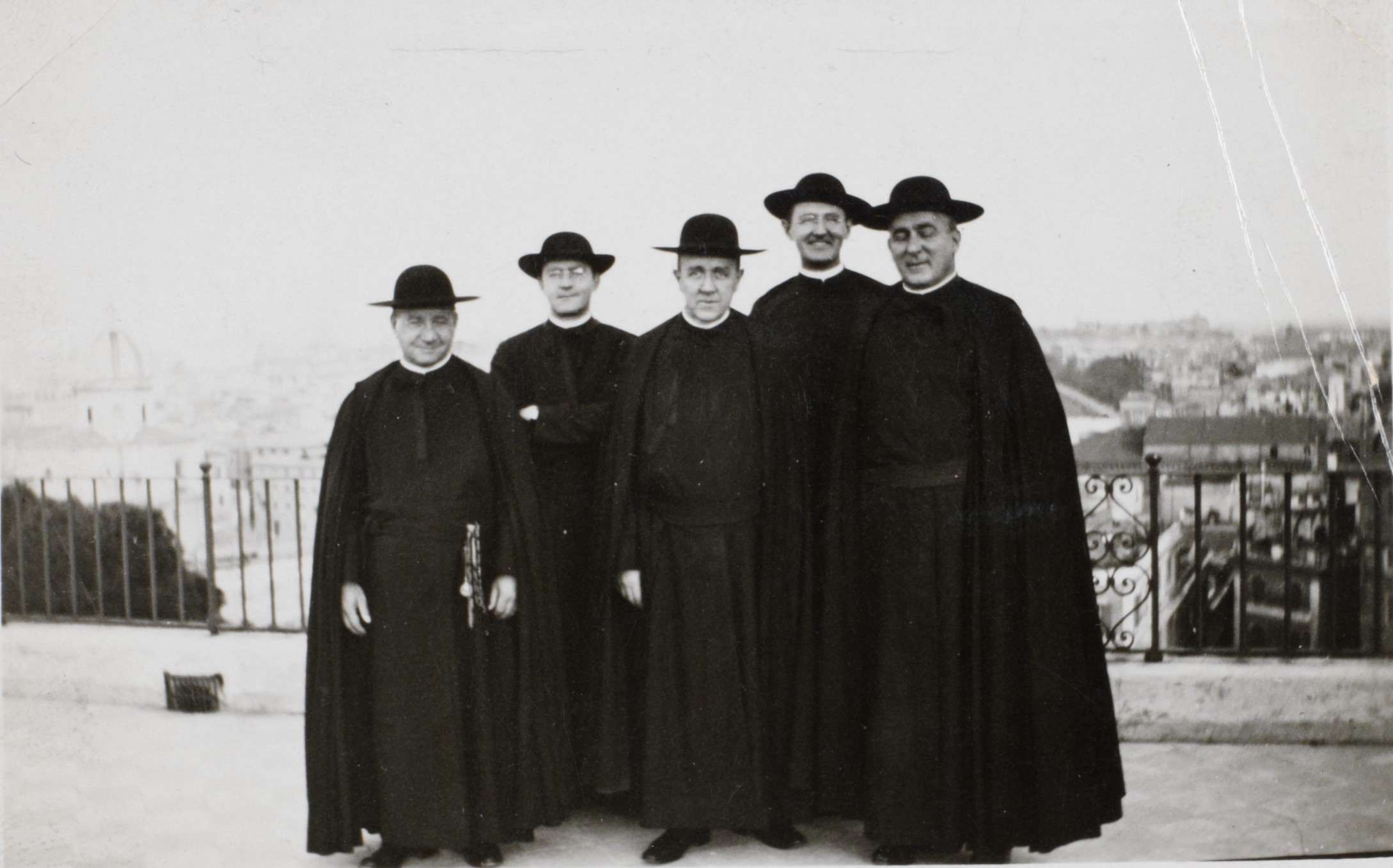
American Jesuits at the 28th General Congregation

General Congregation 27 took place in 1923.

=== General Congregation 28 ===
General Congregation 28 took place in 1938.

=== General Congregation 29 ===
General Congregation 29 took place in 1946. Delayed by World War II raging across Europe, the congregation elected Jean-Baptiste Janssens as the 27th Superior General of the Society of Jesus. Janssens succeeded Wlodimir Ledóchowski, who died in 1942. During this Congregation, the prohibition on Jewish and Muslim converts from entering the Jesuits was formally abrogated.

=== General Congregation 31 ===
General Congregation 31 met during 1965 and 1966, meeting initially for several months, from 7 May to 17 July 1965, then breaking off for over a year and then reconvening for two more months from 8 September to 17 November 1966. GC31 issued 56 decrees and elected Pedro Arrupe as the 28th Superior General.

=== General Congregation 32 ===
General Congregation 32 was held between 1974 and 1975. In particular, Decrees 2 and 4 of the congregation highlighted a Jesuit commitment to "the crucial struggle of our time: the struggle for faith and that struggle for justice which it includes".

=== General Congregation 33 ===
General Congregation 33 in 1983 elected Peter Hans Kolvenbach as Superior General. It reaffirmed the commitment of the previous congregation to the promotion of justice as an integral part of all its ministries in the service of faith, and extended this commitment to refugee populations. In this it was following up on Superior General Pedro Arrupe's founding of the Jesuit Refugee Service in 1980. It also emphasized the importance of inculturation of the church in non-Western cultures, in part due to the large number of delegates coming from various parts of Africa and Asia with, unlike previous congregations, eighteen of the twenty-one delegates from India being native Indians.

=== General Congregation 34 ===
General Congregation 34 took place in 1995. For the first time in Jesuit history, the majority of delegates did not come from Europe and the United States. It endorsed a justice-based mission mindful of the needs of the poor and marginal. It called for understanding differing cultures on their own terms and openness to other religious traditions. As religious vocations had continued to decline, there was an emphasis on enabling others to serve, with specific emphasis on the laity and on women.

=== General Congregation 35 ===
General Congregation 35 took place in Rome between 7 January and 6 March 2008. Adolfo Nicolás was elected as the new Father General. Pope Benedict XVI confirmed and applauded the Society's efforts to venture into the "new frontiers" of our time, which included globalization, new technologies, and environmental concerns, even as the previous themes of promotion of justice and care for refugees are reiterated, along with the need to pass on to the laity the Jesuit charism through the Spiritual Exercises and the practice of communal discernment.

=== General Congregation 36 ===
General Congregation 36 was called in 2016 after Adolfo Nicolás had announced his resignation, and it elected Arturo Sosa as Superior General to replace him. Taking its cue from Pope Francis' encyclical Laudato si', it emphasized that poverty, social exclusion, and marginalization are linked with environmental degradation. In the second of its two decrees it called for greater commitment to discernment, collaboration, and networking, for a broader process for evaluating the Society's current apostolic preferences which included lay colleagues in the discernment.

== Full list of Jesuit General Congregations ==
- General Congragation 1 (19 June 1558 - 10 September 1558);
- General Congragation 2 (21 June 1565 - 3 September 1565);
- General Congragation 3 (12 April 1573 - 16 June 1573);
- General Congragation 4 (7 February 1581 - 2 April 1581);
- General Congragation 5 (3 November 1593 - 18 January 1594);
- General Congragation 6 (21 February 1608 - 29 March 1608);
- General Congragation 7 (5 November 1615 - 26 January 1616);
- General Congragation 8 (21 November 1645 - 14 April 1646);
- General Congragation 9 (13 December 1649 - 23 February 1650);
- General Congragation 10 (7 January 1652 - 20 March 1652);
- General Congragation 11 (9 May 1661 - 27 July 1661);
- General Congragation 12 (22 June 1682 - 6 September 1682);
- General Congragation 13 (22 June 1687 - 7 September 1687);
- General Congragation 14 (19 November 1696 - 16 January 1697);
- General Congragation 15 (17 January 1706 - 3 April 1706);
- General Congragation 16 (19 November 1730 - 13 February 1731);
- General Congragation 17 (22 June 1751 - 5 September 1751);
- General Congragation 18 (17 November 1755 - 28 January 1756);
- General Congragation 19 (9 May 1758 - 18 June 1758)
- General Congragation 20 (9 October 1820 - 10 December 1820);
- General Congragation 21 (30 June 1829 - 17 August 1829);
- General Congragation 22 (22 June 1853 - 31 August 1853);
- General Congragation 23 (16 September 1883 - 23 October 1883);
- General Congragation 24 (24 September 1892 - 5 December 1892);
- General Congragation 25 (1 September 1906 - 18 October 1906);
- General Congragation 26 (2 February 1915 - 18 March 1915);
- General Congragation 27 (8 September 1923 - 21 December 1923);
- General Congragation 28 (12 March 1938 - 9 May 1938);
- General Congragation 29 (6 September 1946 - 23 October 1946);
- General Congragation 30 (6 September 1957 - 11 November 1957);
- General Congragation 31 (7 May 1965 - 15 July 1965; 8 September 1966 - 17 November 1966);
- General Congragation 32 (2 December 1974 - 7 March 1975);
- General Congragation 33 (2 September 1983 - 25 October 1983);
- General Congragation 34 (5 January 1995 - 22 March 1995);
- General Congragation 35 (7 January 2008 - 6 March 2008);
- General Congragation 36 (2 October 2016 - 12 November 2016).

== See also ==
- Superior General of the Society of Jesus
- Society of Jesus
