= Loosdorf =

- Municipality
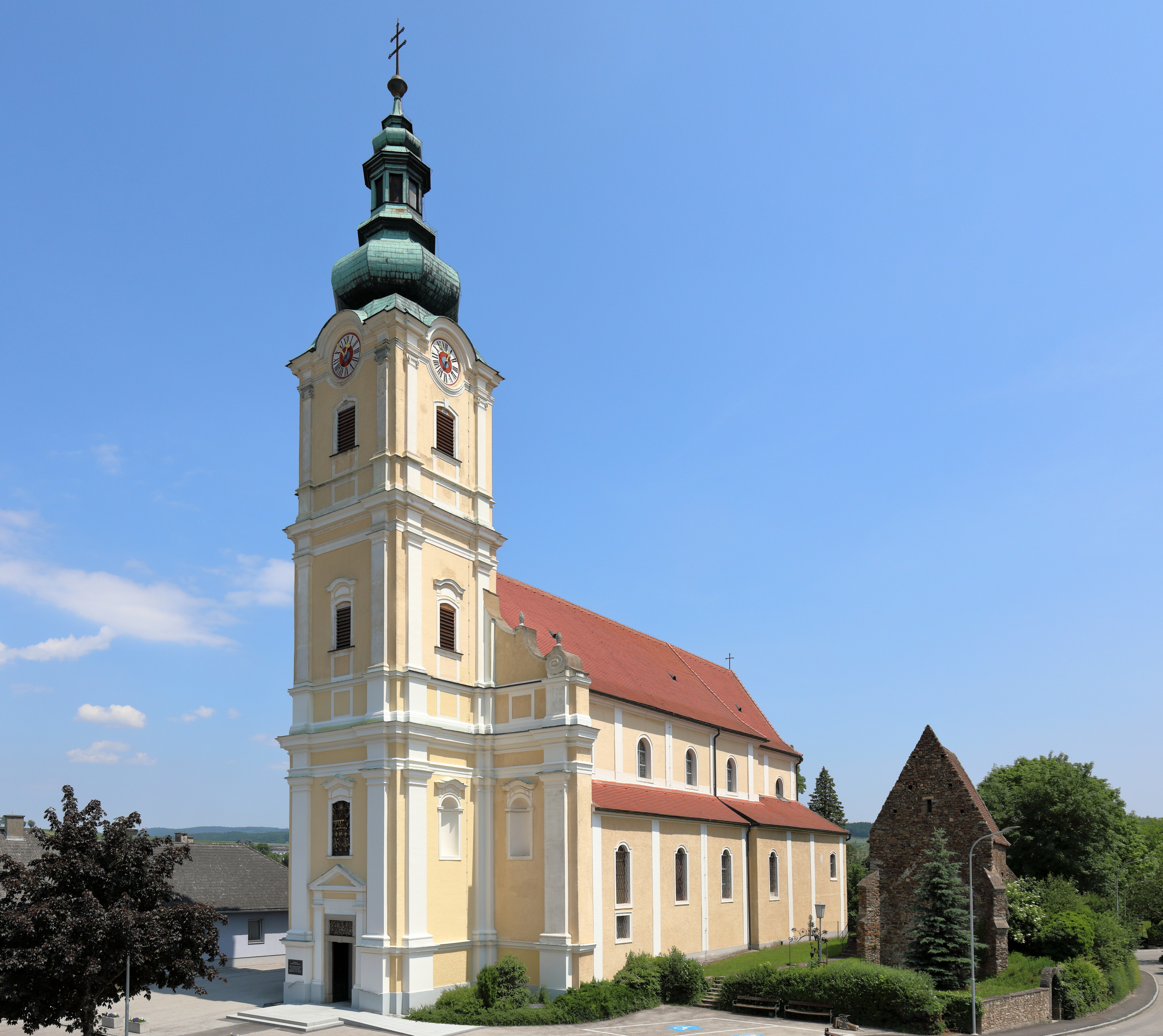
- Church of Saint Lawrence

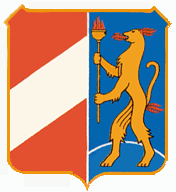
- Coat of arms

- Location within Austria
- Coordinates: 48°12′N 15°24′E
- Country: Austria
- State: Lower Austria
- District: Melk

Government
  - Mayor: Thomas Vasku (SPÖ)

Area
  - Total: 11.89 km^{2} (4.59 sq mi)
- Elevation: 234 m (768 ft)

Population (2018-01-01)
  - Total: 3,794
  - Density: 319.1/km^{2} (826.4/sq mi)
- Time zone: UTC+1 (CET)
  - Summer (DST): UTC+2 (CEST)
- Postal code: 3382
- Area code: 02754
- Website: www.loosdorf.at

Loosdorf is a town in the district of Melk in the Austrian state of Lower Austria.

== History ==
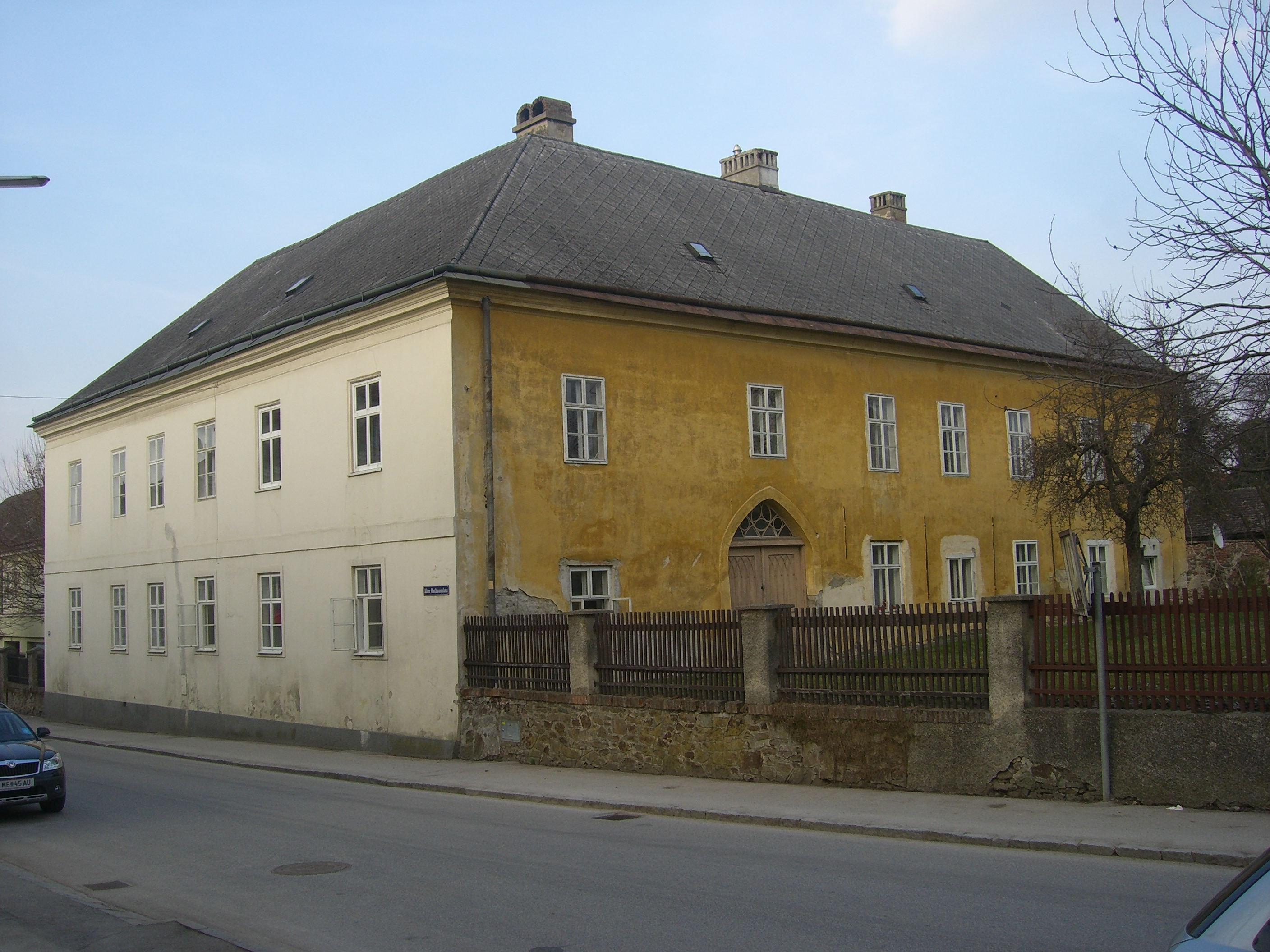
The former grammar school ("Hohe Schule")

The first-known mention of Loosdorf, then referred to as "Ladestorf," dates to 1145. Even from this period, the town had a strong connection to the nearby Schallaburg Castle. Documents from the reign of King Ottokar prove that saffron played a major role in Loosdorf's economy from an early stage.

=== Loosdorf in the 16th Century ===
The town experienced a major period of prosperity in the 16th century, under the reign of Hans Wilhem of Losenstein, who expanded the Schallaburg, rebuilt the town church, which had been destroyed by Turkish soldiers in 1588 and, opened a Protestant school in Loosdorf, called 'die Hohe Schule' ('the High School'). During this period, Loosdorf also achieved the right to organize a market (1584) and a weekly market (1588), solidifying its status as a market town (Marktgemeinde), which it bears to this day.

Under Hans Wilhelm von Losenstein, Loosdorf became a hub of Protestantism in Austria. The Hohe Schule started as a private school, especially for the children of the Lutheran nobility. The statutes of the Lutheran German gymnasium of Loosdorf were printed in Augsburg in 1574. Two original copies still exist. The school statutes are an important source for the study of the history of pedagogy in Austria. It is regarded as original, although some parts show much resemblance to that of the Lutheran gymnasium of Strasbourg. During the counter-reformation, pressure from the Catholic authorities became too great, and in 1627 the school was forced to close after the local prince sent the teachers and administrators of the school into exile.

=== Loosdorf and the Western Railway ===
Due to its location and relative size, Loosdorf was given a train station on the Western Railway (Westbahn) upon its opening in 1858. Loosdorf's train station was an important water stop for the steam locomotives used at the time. The connection to the Western Railway was of such importance that Loosdorf was referred to as "Loosdorf an der Westbahn" (Loosdorf by the Western Railway). The economic boom brought by the railway came hand-in-hand with a societal realignment, as the connection to nearby industrial hubs led to the conservative, bourgeois population being largely replaced by a new, predominately social democratic working class.

=== The Ledóchowska house in Loosdorf from 1862 ===
In 1843 the Austrian Polish count Antoni August Halka Ledóchowski, a brother of the later Archbishop and Cardinal Mieczysław Halka Ledóchowski, acquired the estate Sitzenthal near Loosdorf. He was married to Countess Seilern and they had three sons, Timothy, Anthony, and Casimir. After the early death of his first wife, he married Countess Josephine Salis-Zizers.

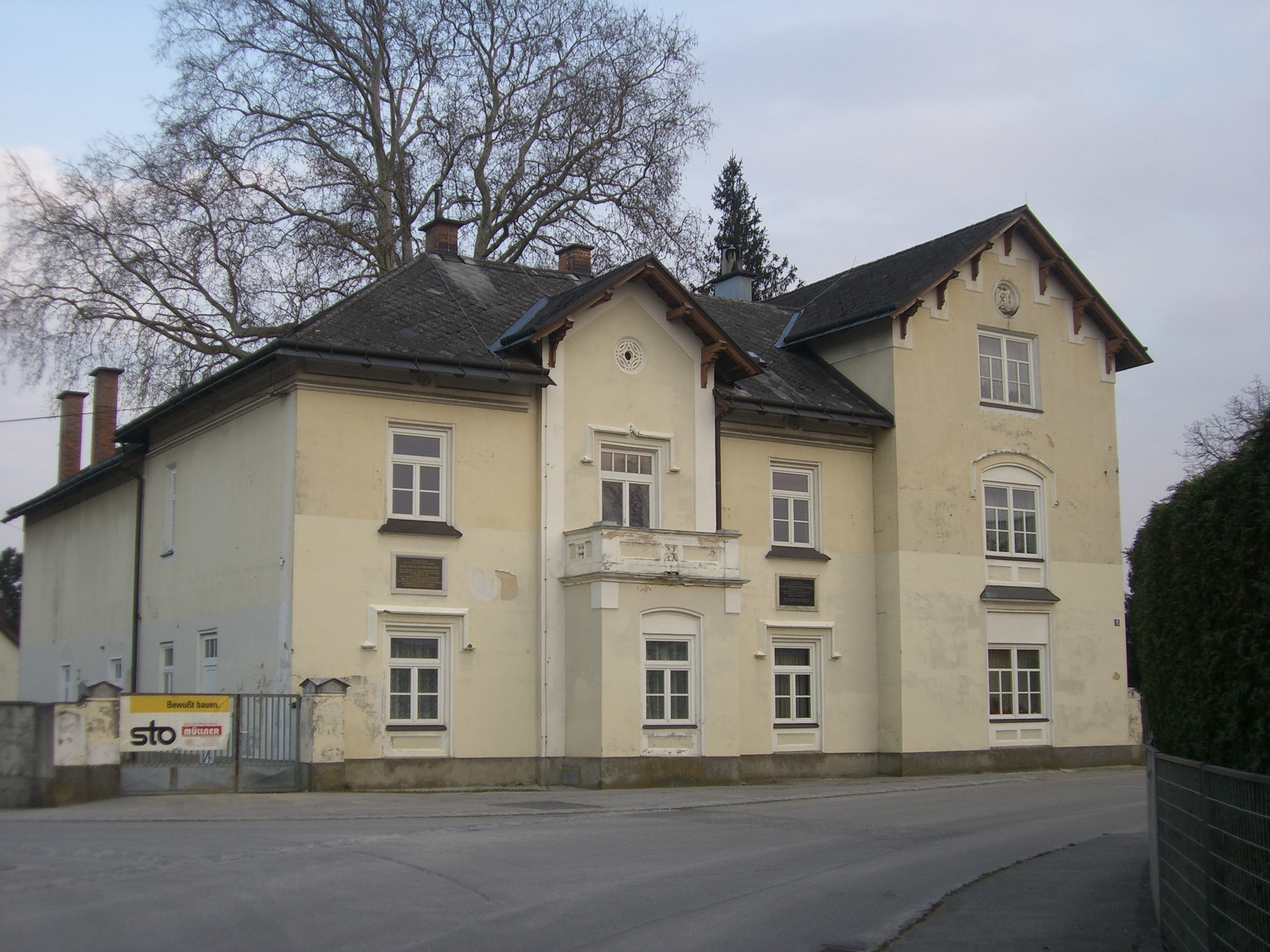
The house in Loosdorf where the Ledóchowski family lived from 1862 until 1874

In 1862 Anthoni Halka Ledóchowski built a manor house in Loosdorf, where he moved, together with his family. In 1863 Mary Theresa was born in this house. Then followed Julia (later called Ursula, after becoming a nun), then Wlodimir, Mary, Ernestine, Frances and Ignatius. Two others died soon after their birth.

Due to the bank crash of 1873, Antoni Halka Ledóchowski lost most of his capital, so in 1874 he sold his house in Loosdorf and moved to St. Pölten. Julia and Mary Theresa attended the Institute B.M.V., then a grammar school for girls run by nuns of the congregation founded by Mary Ward. In April 1882 Count Antoni Halka Ledóchowski acquired an estate in Lipnica in Lower Poland, about 48 km from Kraków. Mary Theresa conducted the renovation and enlargement of the manor house, and in 1883 the family moved there.

In 1883 Julia Halka Ledóchowska became an Ursuline nun in Kraków and after a year she got the name Ursula. She became a missionary in Russia and Scandinavia. She founded the Congregation of the Ursulines of the Agonizing Heart of Jesus, also called the Grey Ursulines, because of their grey habits. Her brother Wlodimir Halka Ledóchowski was the 26th general of the Jesuits. Mary Theresa founded the Soladity of Saint Peter Claver, that acted against slavery in Africa. Ignatius became a general in the Polish army. In 1975 Mary Theresa was beatified by Pope Paul VI. In 1983 Ursula Halka Ledóchowska was also beatified, by Pope John Paul II. In 2003 Ursula Ledóchowska was canonized as a Roman Catholic saint by Pope John Paul II.

In 1883 the Ledóchowska House came into the property of the Counts of Montecuccoli. It changed hands several times. From 1928 until 1938 it belonged to the Chamber of Agriculture of Lower Austria, which opened an agricultural winter school in the building. Finally, the Soladity of Saint Peter Claver of Salzburg, that was founded by Mary Theresa Ledóchowska, acquired the house.

== Fauna ==
The River Pielach flows through Loosdorf. The meandering river is home to a multitude of wildlife and the rare Huchen, the Danube salmon.

== Industry ==
Ytong has its Austrian manufacturing in Loosdorf.

== Born in Loosdorf ==
- Ursula Ledóchowska (1865–1939), a Roman Catholic saint
- Maria Teresia Ledóchowska (1863–1922), a Roman Catholic missionary
- Wladimir Ledóchowski (1868–1942), the 26th general of the Jesuits (from 1915 until 1942)
- Ignacy Kazimierz Ledóchowski (1871–1945), a Polish general
- Hans (von) Hammerstein-Equord (1881–1947), Austrian politician and writer
