= Jesuit Historical Institute =

Research institute in Italy

The Jesuit Historical Institute, also known as IHSI (Latin: Institutum historicum Societatis Iesu), is an international group of Jesuit historians committed since the end of the 19th century to bring out scientifically critical editions of the foundational texts of the Society of Jesus (the MHSI), and to promote research on the history of the Jesuits. Originally based in Madrid, the institute is now quartered in Rome.

== History ==
In the 19th century, a group of Spanish Jesuits began the publication of letters of Saint Ignatius of Loyola. The century's atmosphere of religious controversies and polemical anti-clerical and anti-Jesuit pamphlets and diatribes required, for appropriate rejoinders, that access be given to the foundational documents of Jesuit life and history. Historical science had also made great progress. New methods had been developed.

Encouraged by General Congregation XXIV (of 1892) the Superior General of the Jesuits Luis Martin established in 1893 a 'College of writers' in Madrid, with mission to establish critical editions of the foundational documents of the Society of Jesus, particularly those regarding the life and times of the founders, Saint Ignatius of Loyola and his first companions. The purpose was also to provide material for accurate regional and national histories of the Society to be prepared in various European countries. The historians entrusted with the task adopted the critical methods of contemporary historical research. In January 1894 the first volume of the Monumenta Historica Societatis Iesu came out of the press.

In 1911 the institute extended its field of work and research and began to publish historical monographs on particular aspects of Jesuit life, spirituality and apostolic works. In 1930 the superior general Wlodimir Ledóchowski gave the official name to the institute and decided to transfer it to Rome, where it settled in the ‘Curia Generalizia’, headquarter of the Jesuit Order.

== 21st century ==
=== Change in name ===
In 2010, the apostolate of Jesuit history at the Curia in Rome was reconstituted within the context of the Archives (Archivum Romanum Societatis Iesu - ARSI).

=== Work in Africa ===
In 2010, the Jesuit Historical Institute in Africa (JHIA) was created to encourage the study of the Jesuit's evangelization work in Africa. This work is based in Kenya.

== Collections and publications ==
- The Monumenta Historica Societatis Iesu (MHSI) are critical editions of primary sources from the first centuries of the Society of Jesus’ history. Over 156 volumes have been published.
- Monumenta Historica Societatis Iesu (Nova series) A change of criteria and procedures introduced in 2005 opened a new series of ‘Monumenta’. Translations are added to the critical editions of primary sources. Moreover, volumes are no longer arranged chronologically but thematically.
- The Bibliotheca Institutum Historici Societatis Iesu (BIHSI) are historical monographs on the culture, spirituality and apostolic works of the Society of Jesus. The series, opened in 1941, counts 64 publications in Spanish, French, English, German or Italian (in 2009). The authors are not of necessity Jesuits or members of the Historical Institute.
- Subsidia ad Historiam Societatis Iesu is a series of published research tools in the same domain of Jesuit history: catalogues of persons, specialized bibliographies and index of archival documents. Open in 1957 the series has 15 volumes.
- The Archivum Historicum Societatis Iesu (AHSI) is the bi-annual journal published since 1932 by the institute. It receives articles focussing on aspects of Jesuit history and culture. Critical editions of primary sources are often included. Being a highly specialized journal it accepts articles in all major modern languages: they are accompanied by a brief résumé in English.

== See also ==
Jesuit Online Bibliography
