= Hohe Schule, Loosdorf, Austria =

Coordinates: 48.1989°N 15.4016°E

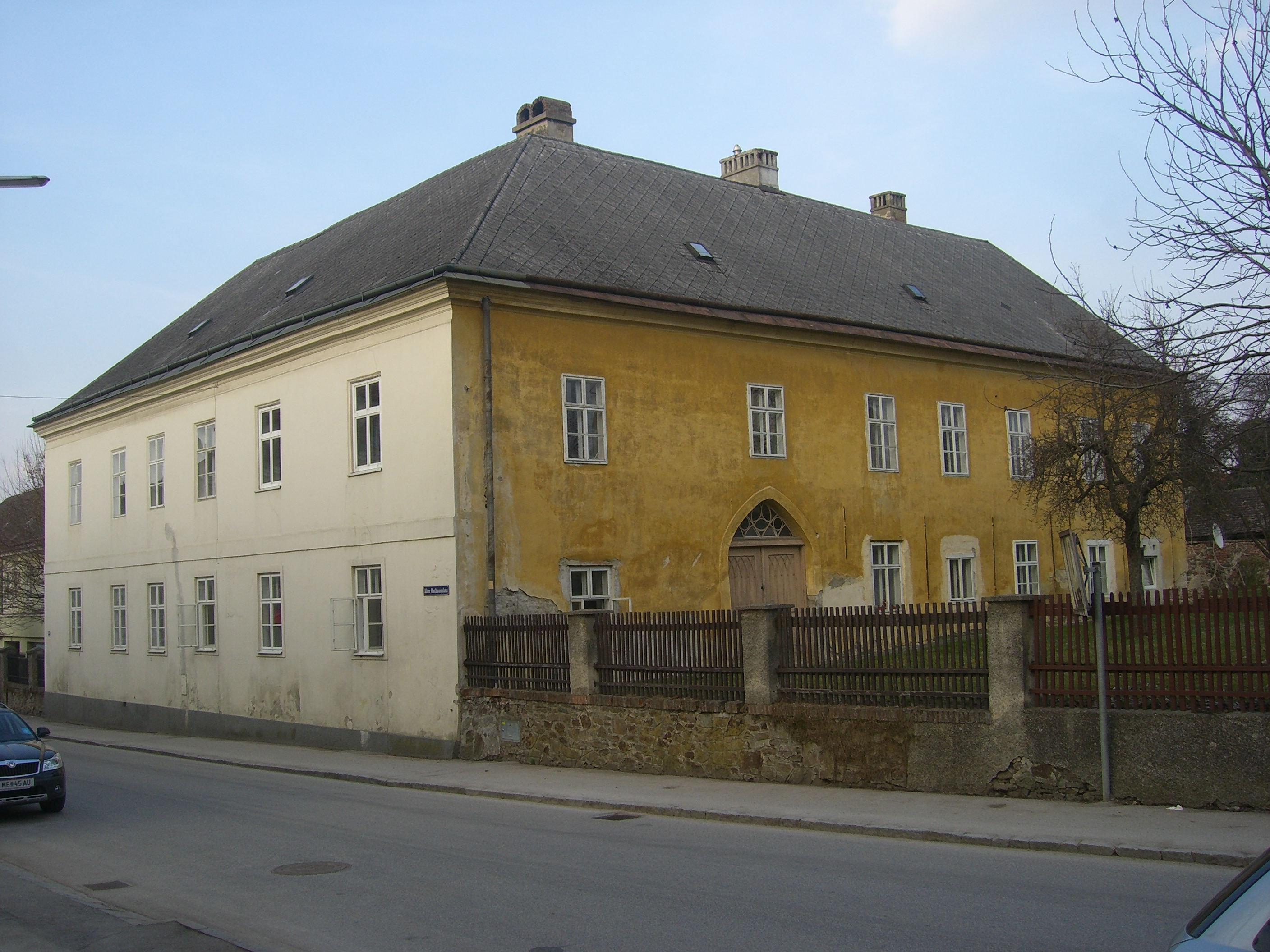
The Loosdorfian house "Hohe Schule" (picture of the western street side and the southern garden side, 2011)

The Hohe Schule (meaning: "The High School") in Loosdorf near Melk was a Protestant school open from ca. 1574 until 1627. It was built in 1574 or a few years earlier by John William of Losenstein as a private Lutheran German grammar school in Lower Austria. According to the school statutes the school was for the youth of the nobility and non-nobility. John William also restored the nearby castle 'Schallaburg' and parish church in Loosdorf in renaissance style. The Hohe Schule has a small inner courtyard and is noted for its characteristic arcades and the rib vaults in the corridors.

== School statutes ==
Two original copies of the statutes of the school (in 16th century German: "die Loßdorffische Schulordnung"), which were printed in Augsburg in 1574, are still left. The statutes resemble those of the Lutheran grammar school of Strasbourg (the predecessor of the University of Strasbourg). Some parts on school rules and punishments even are literally the same, but they do differ on some points. However, unlike many school statutes in 16th century Germany these statutes are not a mere copy of other statutes, but relatively original. The role of the Hohe Schule in the context of (contra)reformation at the end of the 16th and the beginning of the 17th century in Europe has been documented by the University of Vienna. According to the statutes the education was adapted to the talents of the students. Pupils could start from the age of 4 to 6, which was relatively young, as the Landschaftsschule of Linz did not accept pupils under the age of six. In the Loosdorfian school the pupils would learn to read, write and speak both German and Latin, music, religion, mathematics and a few other subjects.

== Provincial school ==
In 1592 it got the status of Landschaftsschule, that meant a school for the nobility of Lower Austria with subsidy from the estates of the knights and the lords of Lower Austria. The reason for that was that the then mainly Protestant lords and knight of the parliament of Lower Austria wanted a replacement for the short lived Landschaftsschule of Vienna that had been closed a few years earlier by the emperor. In 1591 they decided not to build a new Landschaftsschule school, but to support existing schools instead. They granted an annual subsidy of five hundred or six hundred guilders and after a school inspection in 1592 that was raised to one thousand guilders, but from 1607 on that probably gradually got less as the subsidy for the other Protestant Landschaftsschule in Horn in that year also was diminished from one thousand to five hundred guilders.

In 1601 John William of Losenstein died. His sarcophagus was placed in the parish church of Loosdorf. On his tomb it can be read that he founded the Hohe Schule and that posterity should enjoy the school. George Christoph of Losensteinleithen inherited the castle Schallaburg to which the school belonged, but also the debts that had amounted to one hundred and twenty thousand guilders. In 1614 George Christoph of Stubenberg in Styria, his father-in-law, took over all his possessions and paid out the creditors.

In the 17th century the Protestant religion came under pressure in Lower Austria. The Protestants lost the majority in the states of Lower Austria. The school faced financial problems, because less students came to the school and the subsidy from the states of Lower Austria was reduced to 500 guilders per year. The school could stay open for a few years by aid of George Christoph of Stubenberg, but the states of Lower Austria refused to guarantee that they would pay the Stubenberg family back. Autumn 1619 Protestant noblemen from Upper Austria besieged the Abbey of Melk. Imperial troops made an end to that siege and plundered castle Schallaburg and other Protestant castles nearby. Loosdorf and the Hohe Schule were plundered as well. Finally the school had to close in 1627 as a result of a decree issued by emperor Ferdinand II that banned Protestant preachers and teachers from the Archduchy of Austria. The owner of the Schallaburg however secretly kept a Protestant preacher in his castle despite this decree.

== Teachers and students of the school ==
Because of the plundering in autumn 1619 and in later wars little is known about the teachers and students the school. It is estimated that the school in 1593 had about seven teachers and about 150 students. A known teacher of the school was music teacher Daniel Lackner. Vicar Balthasar Masco possibly also gave lessons. He probably played a role in formulating the school statutes. He certainly was one of the inspectors of some school inspections. After two earthquakes in 1590 Masco wrote a small work about earlier earthquakes from the antiquity until 1590, called Erdbidems Spiegel or Speculum terrae motus ("Mirror of the Earth[quakes]", printed in Nuremberg in 1591). In the subtitle he wrote that earthquakes are God's wrath and punishments.
Known students of the school are the brothers Job Hartmann von Enenkel and Georg Achaz von Enenkel who lived on castle Albrechtsberg and Johann Wilhelm von Stuberberg who lived on castle Schallaburg.

== The building after school closure ==
After the school closure in 1627 the building until 1809 served as a private residence for different families of the Austrian gentry. After 1809 the building was sold to plain citizens. In the 19th century little shops were opened close to the little court. The second floor served as private living space.

In the 1980s the building was in a bad condition. In the 1980s the street side of the property was renovated. The shops on the street side were turned into two apartments. Later at the front side of the building two other apartments were created. From 1996 until 2017 the apartments, courtyard and entrance gradually was painted and other changes were made. The house is divided in about ten apartments. In 1996, 2011, 2014 and 2017 the house changed owners.

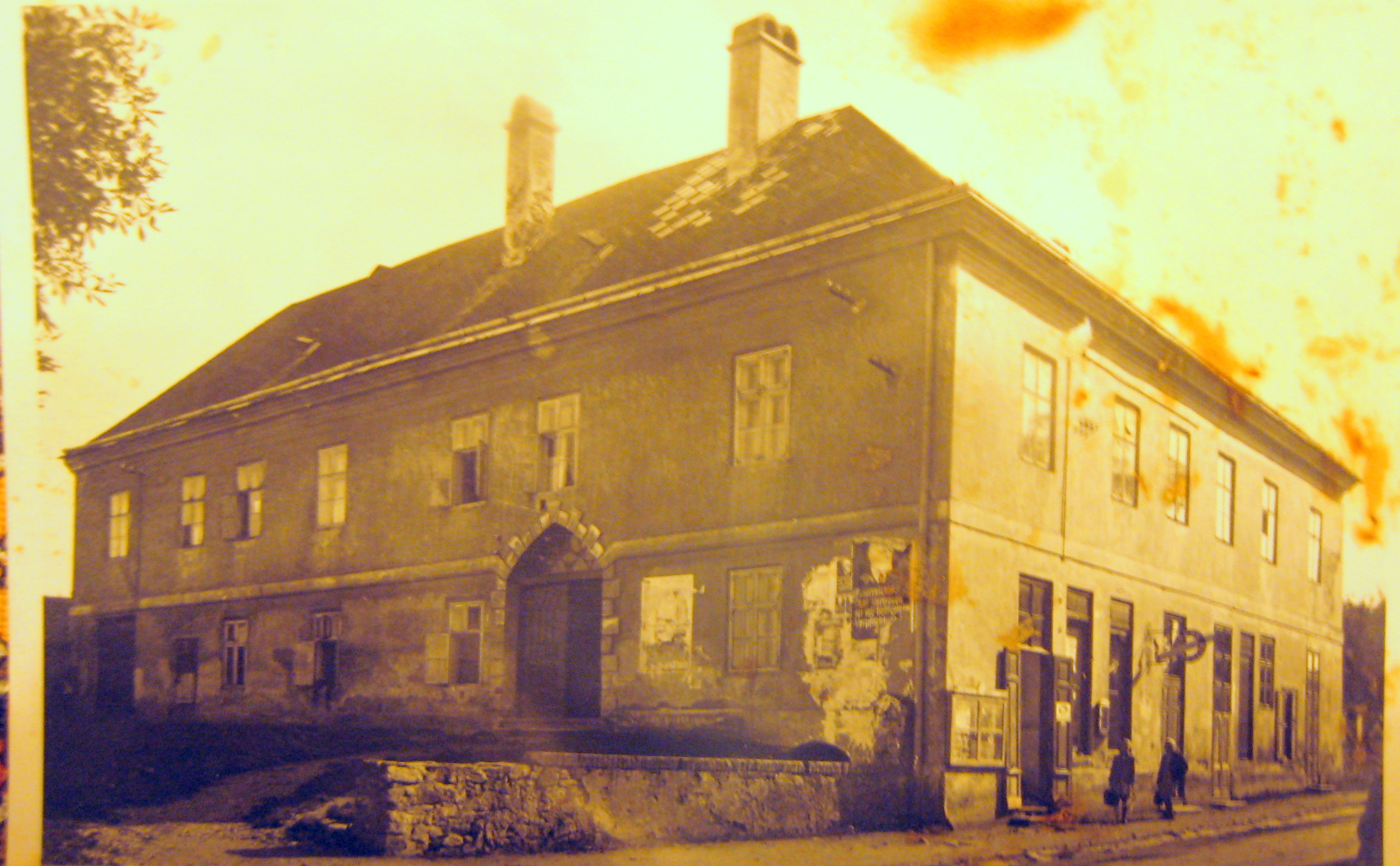

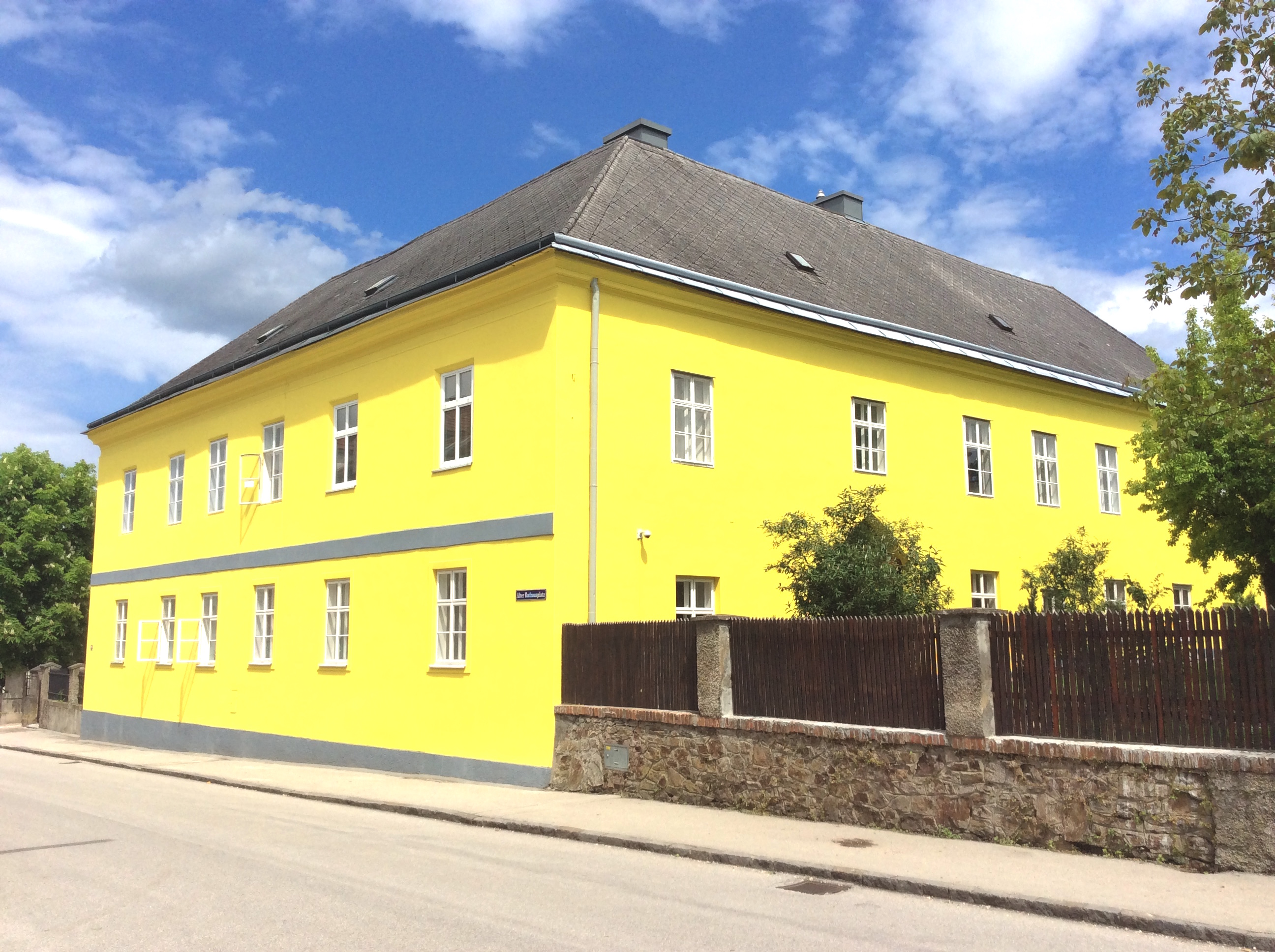

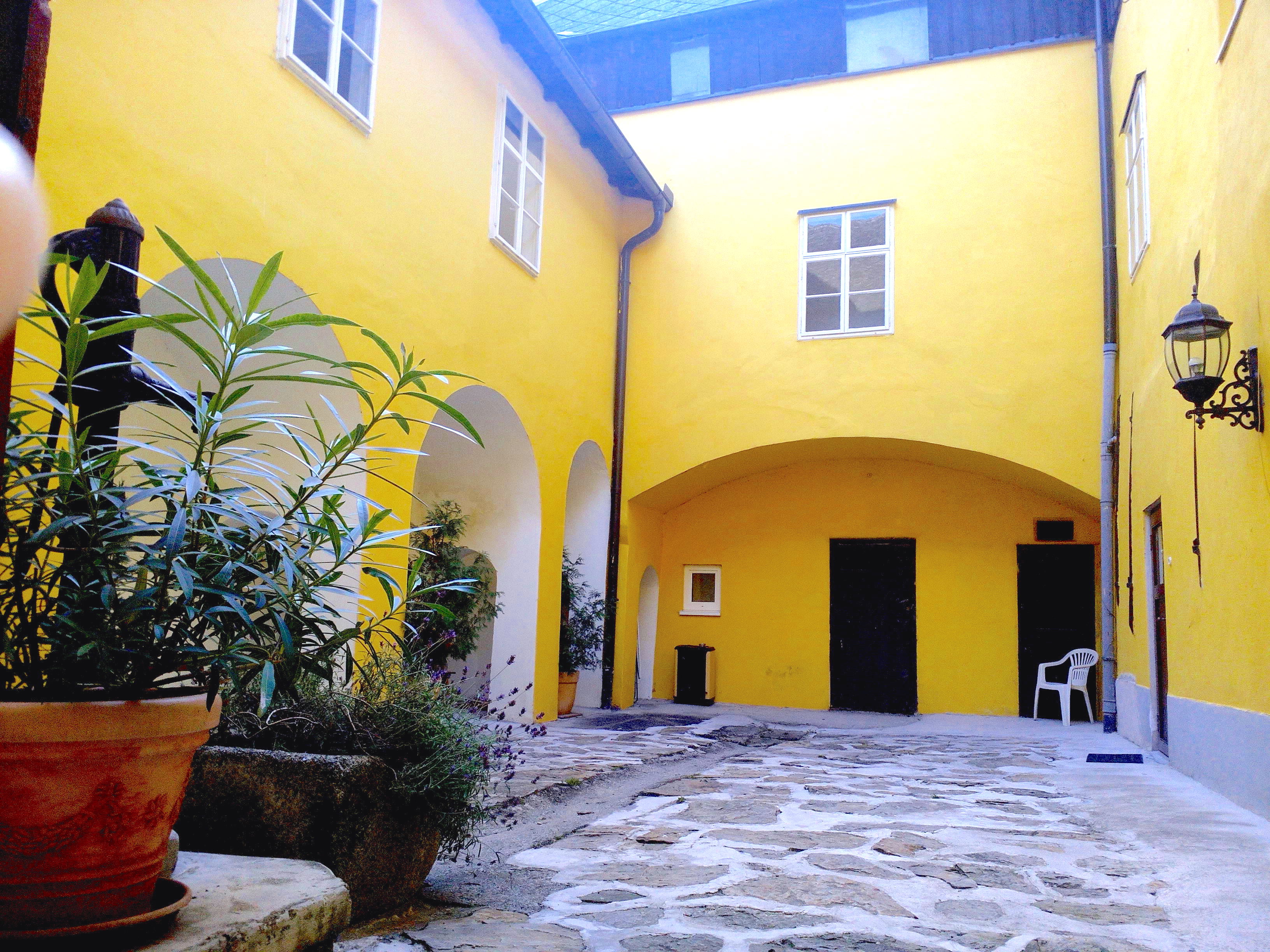

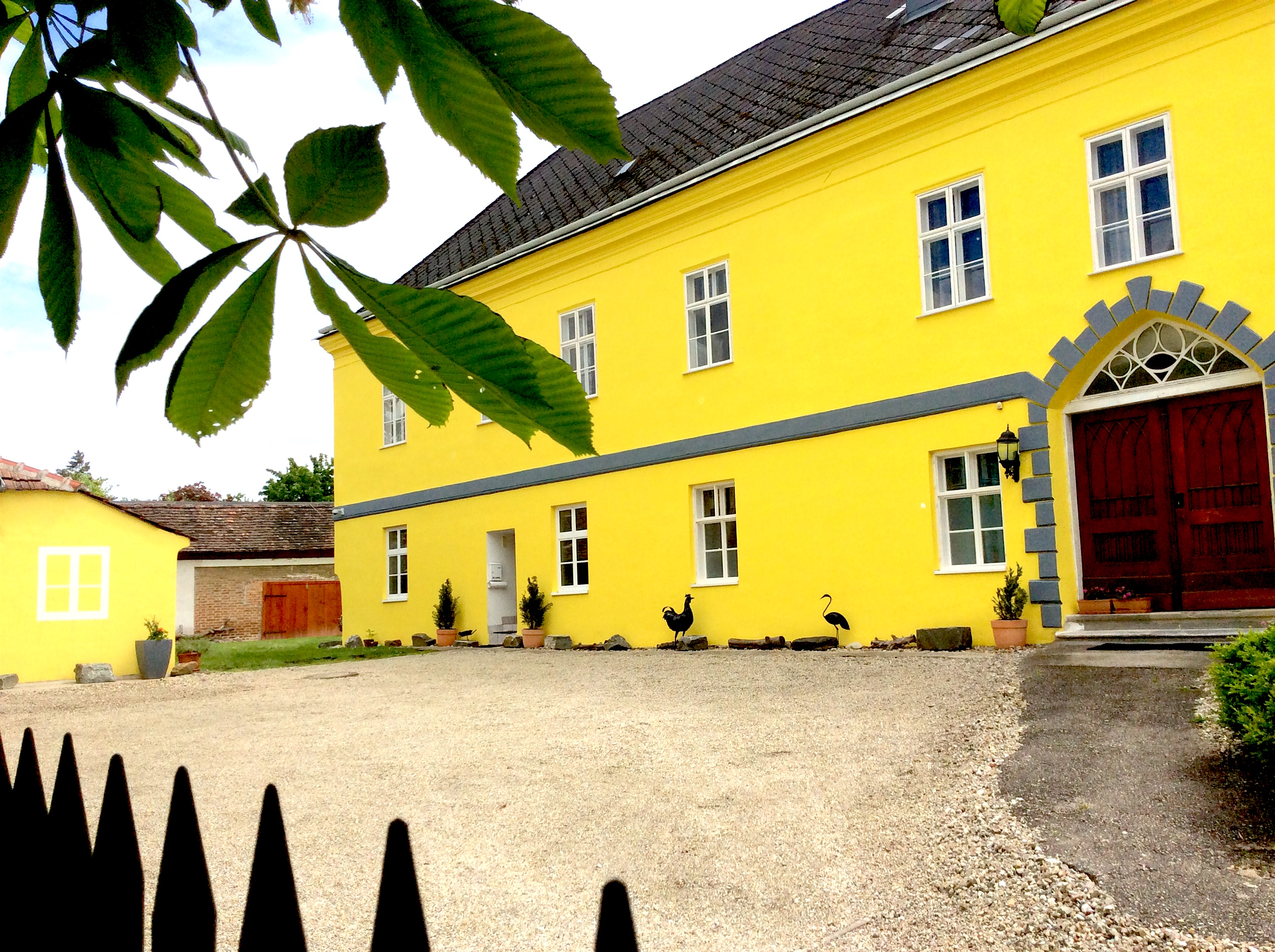

Because of its history and architecture the building is protected by the Austrian "Denkmalschutz". It is the only example of a building that in the 16th century has served as a Protestant school in Austria that has been preserved.

== Literature ==
- Helene Miklas, "Die Protestantische "Hohe Schule" in Loosdorf 1574-1627 - Meilenstein auf dem weg der reformatorischen Pädagogik in Österreich - oder bloß Episode?" (a dissertation), University of Vienna, June 1999
- Schweickhardt, Darstellung des Erzhogentums Österreich unter der Enns, VOW, Band 8, p. 201
- Österreichische Kunsttopographie, Band III (Melk), Vienna 1909, p. 116, 126
- Handbuch der historischen Stätten Österreichs, Band !, Stuttgart 1970, p. 394, ISBN 3-520-27801-4
