= MHSI =

MHSI may stand for:

- Monumenta Historica Societatis Iesu, a collection of writings on the origin and early years of the Society of Jesus
- The Military History Society of Ireland, a learned society
