= Franz Xavier Wernz =

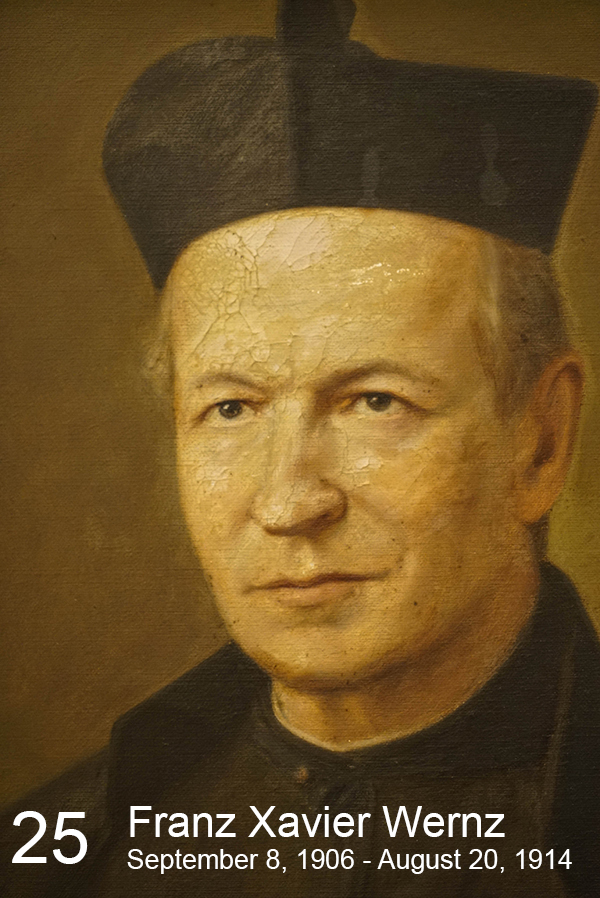
Very Rev. Franz Xavier Wernz, S.J.

Franz Xavier Wernz, SJ (December 4, 1842 – August 19, 1914) was a German Catholic priest who served as the twenty-fifth superior general of the Society of Jesus from 1906 to 1914.

== Life ==
Wernz was the eldest of eight children. He entered the Society of Jesus on December 5, 1857. He made his novitiate at Gorheim near Sigmaringen, and took his first vows on December 8, 1859. From 1864 to 1868 and from 1872 to 1873 he was educator and teacher at Stella Matutina in Feldkirch, Austria. He studied theology and philosophy at the Maria Laach and Aachen abbeys. When the Kulturkampf of Chancellor Bismarck expelled the Jesuits from Germany, the exiled scholastics, after a short stay at Stella Matutina, found refuge in a Jesuit college, Ditton Hall in Lancashire in England and, finally, in 1881 moved to St Beuno's in Wales. After a year of private study he became Professor of Canon Law at Ditton Hall and later at St Beuno's. Between 1882 and 1906 he taught canon law at the Gregorian University, the last two years spent there he also served as its rector.

After the death of Luis Martín, the vicar general summoned a congregation for August 31, 1906, but it began after a day's postponement on September 1 and would last until October 18. On the third ballot taken on September 8, the 64-year-old Wernz was elected general.

During his generalate he vigorously promoted the spiritual life, opened missions and created provinces in all parts of the world. The whole continent of North America was one of his special interests and he approved the setting up of provinces, houses, and colleges the length and breadth of that vast territory. Father Martín had set up the famous Monumenta Historica and Wernz continued his support and encouraged Jesuit writers to take up this important work, which they did with enthusiasm. He was instrumental in the founding of the Jesuit periodicals "Voces e Maria ad Lacum" which became "Stimmen der Zeit" in Germany and another, "Przeglad Powszechny", in Poland.

One of his last letters written on December 25, 1913, to the Society was on the celebration of the centenary of the society's restitution, to take place the following year.

Wernz had been General for seven years and eleven months, from September 8, 1906, until he died on August 19, 1914. His death occurred only a few hours before that of Pope Pius X and a mere three weeks after the outbreak of the First World War. It would be a difficult time for his successor to begin leading an international Society in a world internationally shattered.

His tomb can be found in the Jesuit Mausoleum at the Roman Campo Verano cemetery.

== Bibliography ==
Notes

References

- Owens, Mary Lilliana (1953). Most Rev. Anthony J. Schuler, First Bishop of El Paso: And Some Catholic Activities in the Diocese Between 1915-1942. Revista Catolica Press. - Total pages: 584

Catholic Church titles
Preceded by Luis Martín	Superior General of the Society of Jesus; 1906–1914	Succeeded by Wlodimir Ledóchowski
