= Andrzeja Górska =

Polish nun (1917–2007)

Andrzeja Górska (born Maria Stefania Górska; 2 February 1917 – 15 December 2007) was a Polish Roman Catholic religious sister of the Congregation of the Ursulines of the Agonizing Heart of Jesus, a religious congregation in the Roman Catholic Church.

== Life ==
Górska was born in Łódź, the sixth of nine children. Gorska served as Mother superior of the congregation, who are more commonly known as the "Grey Ursulines".

She was involved in the protection of Jewish children during the German occupation in World War II. In 1997, she received the title of the Righteous Among the Nations for her wartime efforts.

Gorska died on 15 December 2007 in Warsaw. She was 90 years old.

== Awards ==
- Medal of the Righteous Among the Nations (1997)
- Commander's Cross of the Polonia Restituta (2007)
