= Mary Theresa Ledóchowska =

Polish Roman Catholic sister (1863–1922)

Blessed Mary Theresa Ledóchowska SSPC
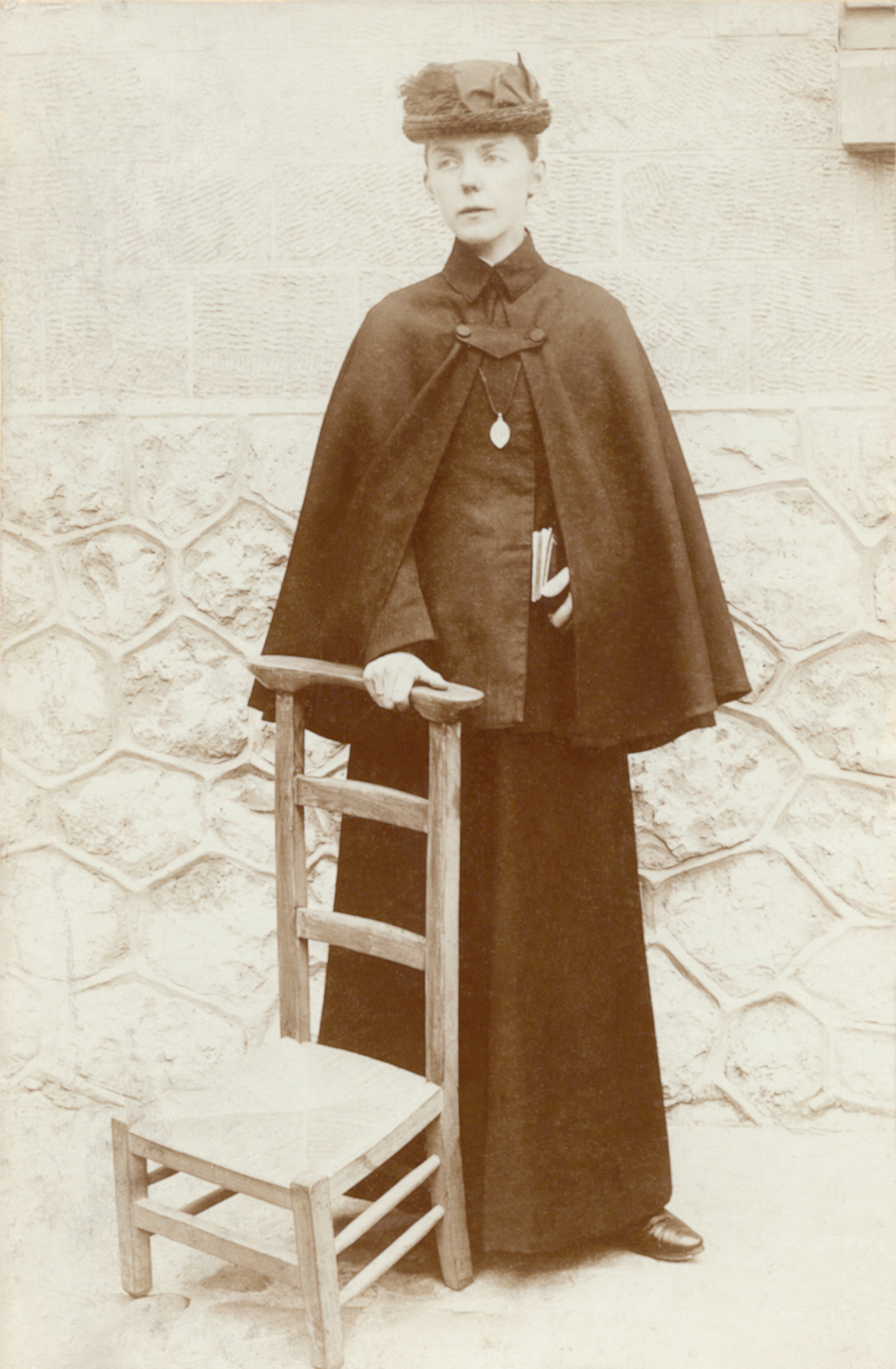
- Born: 29 April 1863; Loosdorf, Lower Austria, Austrian Empire
- Died: 6 July 1922 (aged 59); Rome, Kingdom of Italy
- Venerated in: Roman Catholic Church
- Beatified: 19 October 1975, Vatican City by Pope Paul VI
- Major shrine: Motherhouse of the Missionary Sisters of St. Peter Claver
- Feast: 6 July

Mary Theresa Ledóchowska, SSPC; 29 April 1863 – 6 July 1922), was a Polish Catholic religious sister who founded the Missionary Sisters of St. Peter Claver, dedicated to spreading Catholicism in Africa. She was beatified in 1975.

== Life ==
=== Early life ===
Mary Theresa was the eldest of seven children. Members of the Polish nobility, she and her siblings – including Wlodimir Ledóchowski, Superior General of the Society of Jesus, and St. Ursula Ledóchowska – were born in Loosdorf, the Lower Austrian estate that belonged to their parents, Count Antoni Halka-Ledóchowski and Countess Josephine Salis-Zizers.

As a young girl, Ledóchowska exhibited a great love of the arts and displayed talent as a writer. She loved society life and would dress in her finest attire to attend the balls which were part of her family's social life. She was educated by the Sisters of Loreto in Sankt Pölten and displayed a strong Catholic piety, as was typical in her family. Her social life continued until both she and father contracted smallpox in 1885. She was nursed back to health, but her father succumbed to the disease. After his death, their uncle, Cardinal Mieczysław Halka Ledóchowski, took charge of their care.

From 1885 to 1890, in order to help her family, which had fallen into economic difficulties, she obtained the position of lady-in-waiting to Princess Alice of Parma, the Grand Duchess of Tuscany, at the imperial palace in Salzburg. While living at court, she attended concerts and balls often. At the same time, she remained strictly committed to her faith. Under the guidance of a Franciscan friar who served as spiritual director to both the princess and her, she was admitted to the Third Order of St. Francis, following its spirituality and its emphasis on venerating the Passion of Christ.

Shortly after her arrival, two members of the Franciscan Missionaries of Mary came to the court seeking financial help for their missionary work. Two religious sisters shared their experiences of working with lepers in Madagascar. The following year, sisters of the same congregation arrived at the court with the same purpose. Their accounts of work in the overseas missions sparked a desire in her to commit herself to similar work. Her interest in the missions increased when she read a pamphlet on Cardinal Charles Lavigerie's anti-slavery campaign. Pope Leo XIII had entrusted the evangelization of Africa to Lavigerie. She began to publicize his cause, and soon attracted donors.

=== Missionary service ===
In 1889 Princess Alice arranged for Ledóchowska to meet Cardinal Lavigerie. He encouraged her to establish committees throughout Europe in order to combat African slavery. She proceeded to do so, starting them in Salzburg, Sankt Pölten, Vienna, and Kraków. She began to use her literary talent to oppose slavery and protest the inhuman treatment of women then prevalent in Africa. She wrote a novel entitled Zaida to show the terrible consequences of slavery, especially for women. At the same time, she began a mission page in a Catholic periodical. These mission features, called Echo From Africa, were based on letters from missionaries serving in Africa. The page of letters evolved into a monthly magazine, which made its debut in 1889, with her as the publisher, rare for a woman in the 19th century. The magazine soon became a full-time job, and Ledóchowska left her duties at the imperial court in 1891 so as to devote all of her time and energy to the missions. The print run of the magazine peaked at 44.000 copies in 1913. It was published in multiple languages including Polish, Italian, French, and English.

Ledóchowska took up residence with a community of the Daughters of Charity of St. Vincent de Paul in Salzburg. Struggling to find financial support for her project, she lived in near poverty, surviving on a prebend granted to her by Empress Elisabeth of Austria.

=== Foundress ===
As the work expanded, Ledóchowska's vision took shape gradually. She began to recruit other women as "auxiliary missionaries", whom she organized in 1894 as the Sodality of St. Peter Claver for the African Missions and the Liberation of Slaves, an association of laywomen. She placed her work – publicizing the needs of the missions in Africa and raising funds for them – under the patronage of the Spanish Jesuit missionary, Peter Claver, who spent a lifetime in service to the enslaved African people brought to South America, which earned him the title of "Apostle to the Slaves"; he had recently been declared a saint.

On April 29, 1894, Pope Leo XIII formally blessed the enterprise, approving the Sodality of St. Peter Claver as a Pious association of the faithful. Out of this society, the auxiliary missionaries developed into a religious congregation. On 8 September 1897, the Feast of the Nativity of Mary (but also the anniversary of Claver's death), she and her first companions made their final vows as Missionary Sisters of St. Peter Claver. They adapted Jesuit constitutions for their own use.

The foundress traveled throughout Europe, addressing various conferences and international gatherings of Catholics to speak about the evils of slavery. Between 1891 and 1922, she gave at least 28 public lectures across Austria, Germany, France, Switzerland, Italy, and Poland to rally support and funds for the African missions. She became aware of the lack of printed resources available in African languages. Her publishing house began to produce books to answer this need, ranging from Bibles and dictionaries to hymnals. The number of sisters began to grow and the congregation began to open houses in Africa and around the world.

=== Death ===
Ledóchowska moved to Rome in order to run her congregation better from there. She developed tuberculosis but continued to serve the needs of the missions and her congregation. She died on July 6, 1922, in the congregation's motherhouse in Rome.

== Legacy ==
Today, the Sisters of St. Peter Claver serve in 23 countries around the globe. The periodical Echo from Africa still appears regularly in several languages. The Archdioces of Salzburg awards an annual prize to students in honor of her.

=== Veneration ===
During her own lifetime, Ledóchowska had become known as the "Mother of the African missions". Immediately after she died, her sisters asked for notification of answered prayers and copies of correspondence from her. Her remains were exhumed and transferred to the chapel of the General Motherhouse in 1934.

Ledóchowska's spiritual writings were approved by theologians on 20 November 1940, 2 August 1942, and 25 July 1952. Her cause was formally opened on 26 January 1945, granting her the title of Servant of God. She was beatified by Pope Paul VI on October 19, 1975, together with Arnold Janssen, Josef Freinademetz, and Eugène de Mazenod. Her feast day is 6 July.

=== Colonialism ===
Some modern scholars have analyzed Ledóchowska's work within the context of European colonialism. Historian Esaie Djomo describes her publications and the Sodality as an "infrastructure" for a "Catholicization" of Africa that sought to displace both indigenous religions and Islam, which she characterized as a "false" religion and a "destructive, gnawing worm". Djomo views her activism as a form of religious colonization.

== See also ==
- Ledóchowski
- Ursula Ledóchowska
