= Ursula Ledóchowska =

Polish Roman Catholic nun and saint (1865–1939)

Saint Ursula Ledóchowska USAHJ
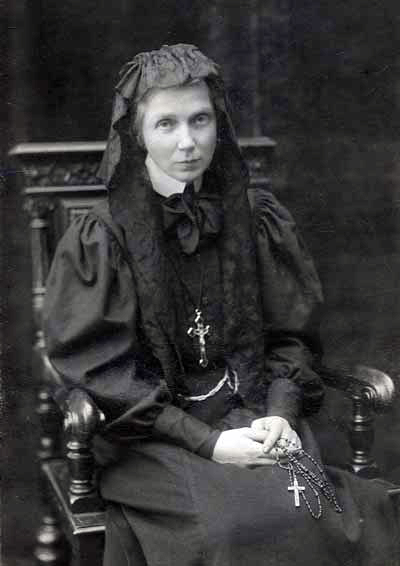
- Photograph taken in 1907.
- Born: 17 April 1865; Loosdorf, Melk, Lower Austria, Austrian Empire
- Died: 29 May 1939 (aged 74); Rome, Kingdom of Italy
- Venerated in: Roman Catholic Church
- Beatified: 20 June 1983, Poznań, Poland by Pope John Paul II
- Canonized: 18 May 2003, Saint Peter's Square, Vatican City by Pope John Paul II
- Feast: 29 May

Julia Ledóchowska, USAHJ (17 April 1865 – 29 May 1939), in religion Maria Ursula of Jesus, was a Polish Catholic religious sister who founded the Ursulines of the Agonizing Heart of Jesus.

Ledóchowska was a prolific supporter of Polish independence which she often spoke about at conferences across Scandinavia while she settled in Russia for a time to open convents until her expulsion. She continued to found convents across Scandinavian countries and even translated a Finnish catechism. She later founded her order, which she managed from Rome at the behest of Pope Benedict XV.

Her death brought calls for a sainthood process, which was opened in 1981 despite diocesan investigations happening decades prior. The confirmation of her heroic virtue allowed for her to be named as Venerable in 1983; Pope John Paul II beatified her in Poznań in 1983 and later canonized her in Saint Peter's Square in 2003.

== Life ==
Julia Ledóchowska was born just after Easter on 17 April 1865 in Loosdorf into a prominent noble house as the fifth of ten children to Count Antoni Halka-Ledóchowski and his second wife Countess Josephine Salis-Zizers. Mieczysław Cardinal Halka-Ledóchowski was her paternal uncle.

Due to financial reverses in 1874 all relocated to Sankt Pölten, Austria where she and her sister Maria Theresia attended a grammar school that the Sisters of Loreto were managing. In 1882 her father – who longed to return to his homeland knowing his end was near – acquired an estate in Lipnica Murowana near Tarnów and in 1883 moved there where her father died in 1885 due to smallpox; her sister Maria Theresia also contracted this but recovered from it. He died after having blessed her desire to become a nun. The siblings' cardinal uncle took care of them after this.

On 18 August 1886 she entered the novitiate of the Ursulines in Kraków. In 1887 she received the religious habit and was given the religious name Maria Ursula of Jesus; she made her perpetual vows on 28 April 1889. In 1904 she was elected as the mother superior of the convent and remained in that position until 1907.

In Kraków the order opened a home for female college students and at that time it proved to be a new phenomenon. Maria Ursula often spent hours in Eucharistic adoration. With a special blessing of Pope Pius X she went to St. Petersburg. There she worked to build up the Saint Catharine House which was a residence for Polish children and adolescents that were living there at the behest of its pastor Konstantin Budkiewicz. The nuns were forced to wear civil clothes since Roman Catholic institutions were illegal in the Russian Empire. Once the tsarist government oppression to the faith grew she moved to the Russian-controlled Finland where she translated songs and a catechism for the Finnish fishermen who were Protestants for the most part. Maria Ursula also set up a free clinic for ill people as well as for the fishermen and their families. But her apostolic zeal soon attracted undue attention for the Russians began to monitor her moves and decided that enough was enough. In 1914 she was expelled from the Russian Empire and sought refuge in neutral Sweden though still kept in touch with the religious who remained in Russia. While in Sweden she committed herself to ecumenism and to that end worked alongside the Lutheran archbishop Nathan Söderblom. In 1915 she set up the newspaper Solglimtar.

Ledóchowska settled in Stockholm and started a language school and a domestic science school for girls while there in 1917 published the book Polonica in three different languages. In Denmark in 1918 she founded an orphanage and a school of home economics in Aalborg. In 1920 she returned to Poland with 40 other nuns who had joined her in her mission and with permission from Rome changed a convent in Pniewy into the Congregation of the Ursulines of the Agonizing Heart of Jesus which were founded on 7 June 1920. It was in Poland that the apostolic nuncio Achille Ratti – future Pope Pius XI – encouraged and blessed her work. In 1928 she founded a religious center in Rome where she had been living for sometime after Pope Benedict XV had invited her to manage the order there at the beginning of that decade. In 1930 she sent 30 nuns to female Polish workers in France. Ledóchowska was a noted orator who often called for and defended the right for Polish independence; she spoke in various forums and often addressed national leaders and fellow nobles from time to time.

In mid-1939 she died in Rome in the convent at Via del Casaletto due to a carcinoma. A fellow sister noticed that she had not come to the Vespers and knocked on her door before finding her dead with a rosary in her hand. Her incorrupt relics were translated to the convent in Pniewy on 29 May 1989. In 2005 her order had 832 religious in 98 houses in countries such as Canada and the Philippines amongst others; it received papal approval on 4 June 1923.

== Sainthood ==
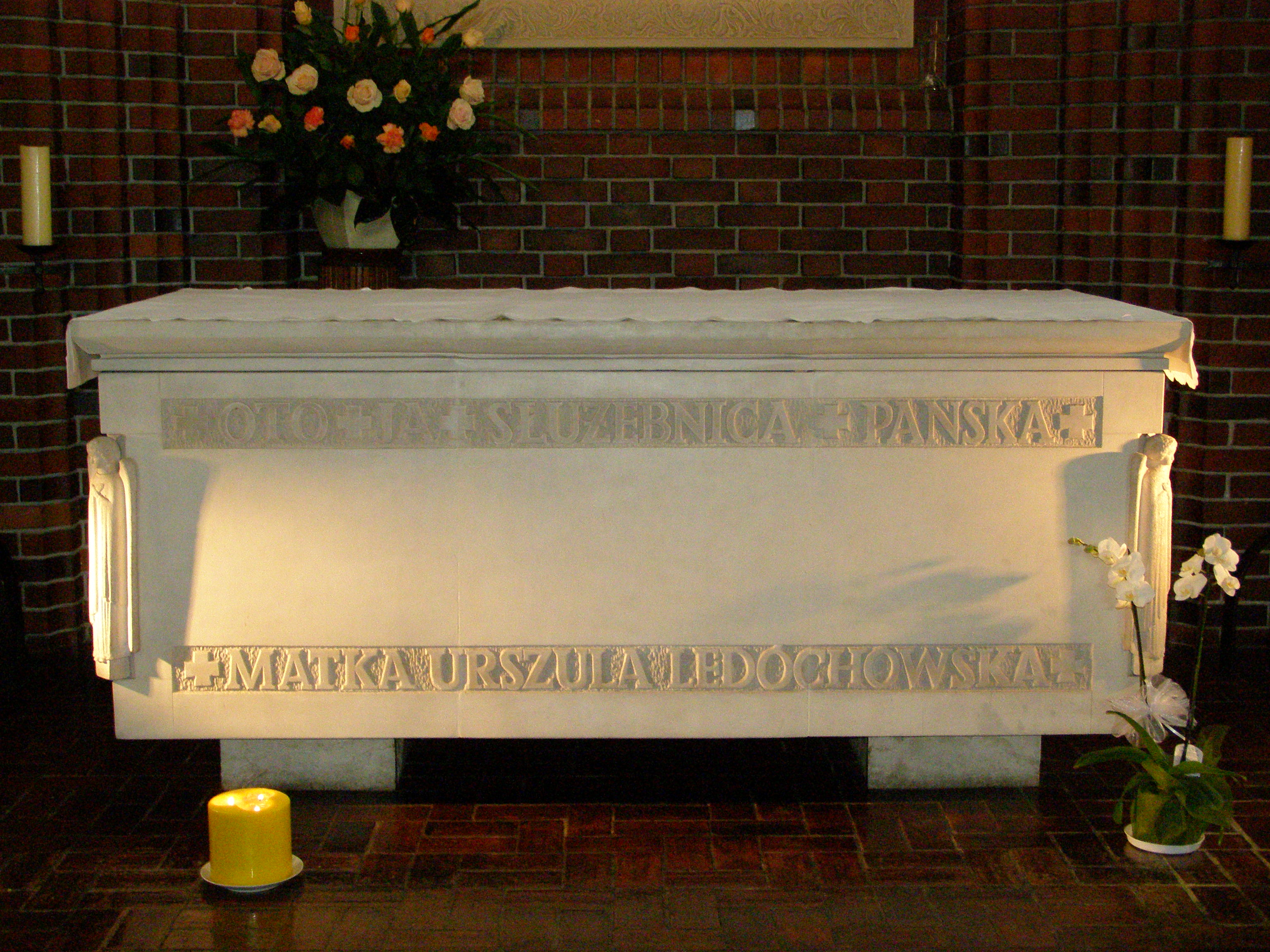
Sarcophagus in the sanctuary in Pniewy, inscripted with "Mother Ursula Ledóchowska"

The beatification process opened in the Diocese of Rome in an informative process that spanned from 16 March 1949 until 9 April 1957. Once the investigations had been completed though two separate processes were held; one was held in Kraków from 23 June 1950 to 2 June 1951 while the other was held in Viviers from 13 May 1931 until 28 May 1951. Her writings were all collated and had to be investigated to determine that such writings adhered to official doctrine; the theologians who viewed them approved them on 12 July 1966. The formal introduction of the cause did not come until 15 October 1981 when she was titled Servant of God. The apostolic process was dispensed with so the findings of the investigation thus far were sent to Rome to the Congregation for the Causes of Saints who validated these processes on 10 December 1982. The Congregation and their consultants approved the positio on 18 January 1983 while the Congregation alone gave their independent approval on 29 March 1983. On 14 May 1983 she was named as Venerable after Pope John Paul II confirmed that she had lived a life of heroic virtue.

Ledóchowska's beatification depended on two miracles prior to the 1983 alterations and as such two cases – both in Kraków – were investigated. The first was investigated from 27 September 1971 until 17 February 1972 and the other was investigated from 16 April 1973 until 26 February 1974. These processes received the validation on 10 December 1982 before a medical board of experts approved these miracles on 7 April 1983. Theologians likewise issued their approval on 17 May 1983 as did the Congregation on 7 June 1983. John Paul II granted the final authorization to it on 9 June 1983 and beatified Ledóchowska while visiting Poznań on 20 June 1983.

One final miracle was needed for the canonisation and the case was investigated in Poland from 16 April 1998 until 26 June 1998. The medical experts approved this case on 30 March 2000 as did the theologians on 1 February 2002 and the Congregation on 12 March 2002. John Paul II approved this on 23 April 2002 while setting the date for the canonisation at a consistory on 7 March 2003. The canonisation was celebrated in Saint Peter's Square on 18 May 2003 before a crowd of 50 000 people.

=== Miracles ===
The first miracle that led to her beatification involved the cure of Jan Kołodziejski on 26 March 1946 while the second miracle leading to beatification involved the cure of a sister of the Ursulines of the Agonizing Heart of Jesus, Maria Danuta Pawlak, on 16 April 1946. The decisive miracle that led to Ledóchowska's canonization was the cure of Daniel Gajewski who avoided electrocution in circumstances where he would otherwise have been killed had it not been for the late religious sister whom he saw moments before fading into unconsciousness on 2 August 1996.

=== Patronage ===
In October 1998 Blessed Ursula was appointed a Patron Saint of the Archdiocese of Poznan.

== See also ==
- Wlodimir Ledóchowski
