= Missionary Sisters of St. Peter Claver =

Catholic order

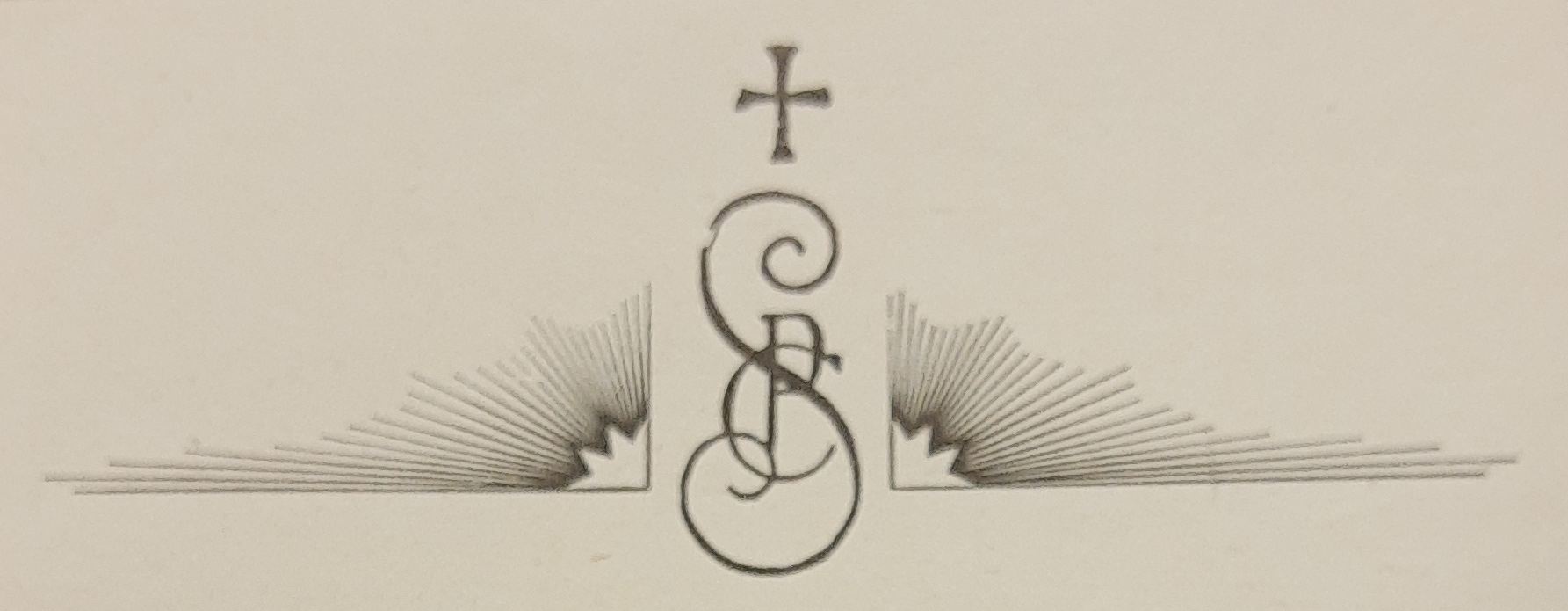
The logo which the Sodality used in 1912

The Missionary Sisters of St. Peter Claver is a Catholic religious congregation of women dedicated to serving the spiritual and social needs of the poor around the world, particularly in Africa. They were founded in Austria by Mary Theresa Ledóchowska and received their first official approbation in 1893. They are devoted to the legacy of Peter Claver.

The beginnings of the sodality are in Salzburg, Austria, although the headquarters of the Claver Sisters is now in Rome, Via Olmata 16. There was also soon a central office for the United States in St. Louis, located in the Fullerton Building. In Salzburg, there was a "Claverianum" with an ethnographic Africa museum at Dreifaltigkeitsgasse 19. Today, the Salzburg operations are based in the Mission House in Maria Sorg in Bergheim.

The sisters became known for editing and distributing several missionary publications, among them Echo aus Afrika and Das Negerkind, which soon appeared in eight languages. They also published a small series of polyglot African resources.

All the work is done by women, some of them religious sisters, some of them lay volunteers. Today, they serve worldwide.
