= Zofia Zdybicka =

Polish nun and philosopher (1928–2026)

Zofia Józefa Zdybicka
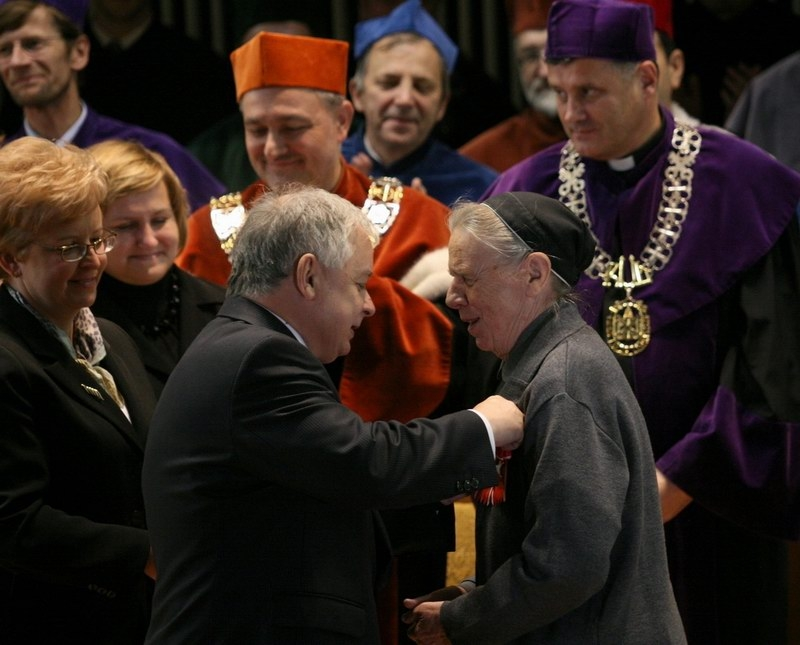
- Zdybicka receiving the Order of Polonia Restituta, 2008
- Born: 5 August 1928; Kraśnik, Poland
- Died: 24 April 2026 (aged 97); Warsaw, Poland
- Scientific career
- Fields: Philosophy of religion, Metaphysics
- Workplaces: John Paul II Catholic University of Lublin

Zofia Józefa Zdybicka (5 August 1928 – 24 April 2026) was a Polish Catholic nun and philosopher specializing in ontology and the philosophy of religion. She was a long-time professor at the John Paul II Catholic University of Lublin and a representative of the Lublin School of Philosophy.

A member of the Congregation of the Ursulines of the Agonizing Heart of Jesus, she took the religious name Maria Józefa.

== Life and career ==
Zdybicka was born in Kraśnik, Poland. She joined the Ursuline order and pursued academic studies in philosophy. She obtained her doctoral degree in 1965, completed her habilitation in 1970, and was awarded the title of professor in 1988.

She was affiliated with the John Paul II Catholic University of Lublin for most of her academic career, where she worked as a lecturer, researcher, and academic administrator. She served, among other roles, as head of the Department of Philosophy of Religion and as dean of the Faculty of Philosophy.

Her research focused on metaphysics, the nature of being, the existence of God, and the philosophical understanding of religion. She contributed to the development of philosophy of religion as a distinct discipline within the framework of classical metaphysics.

Zdybicka died in Warsaw on 24 April 2026, at the age of 97.
