= Schollach =

- Municipality
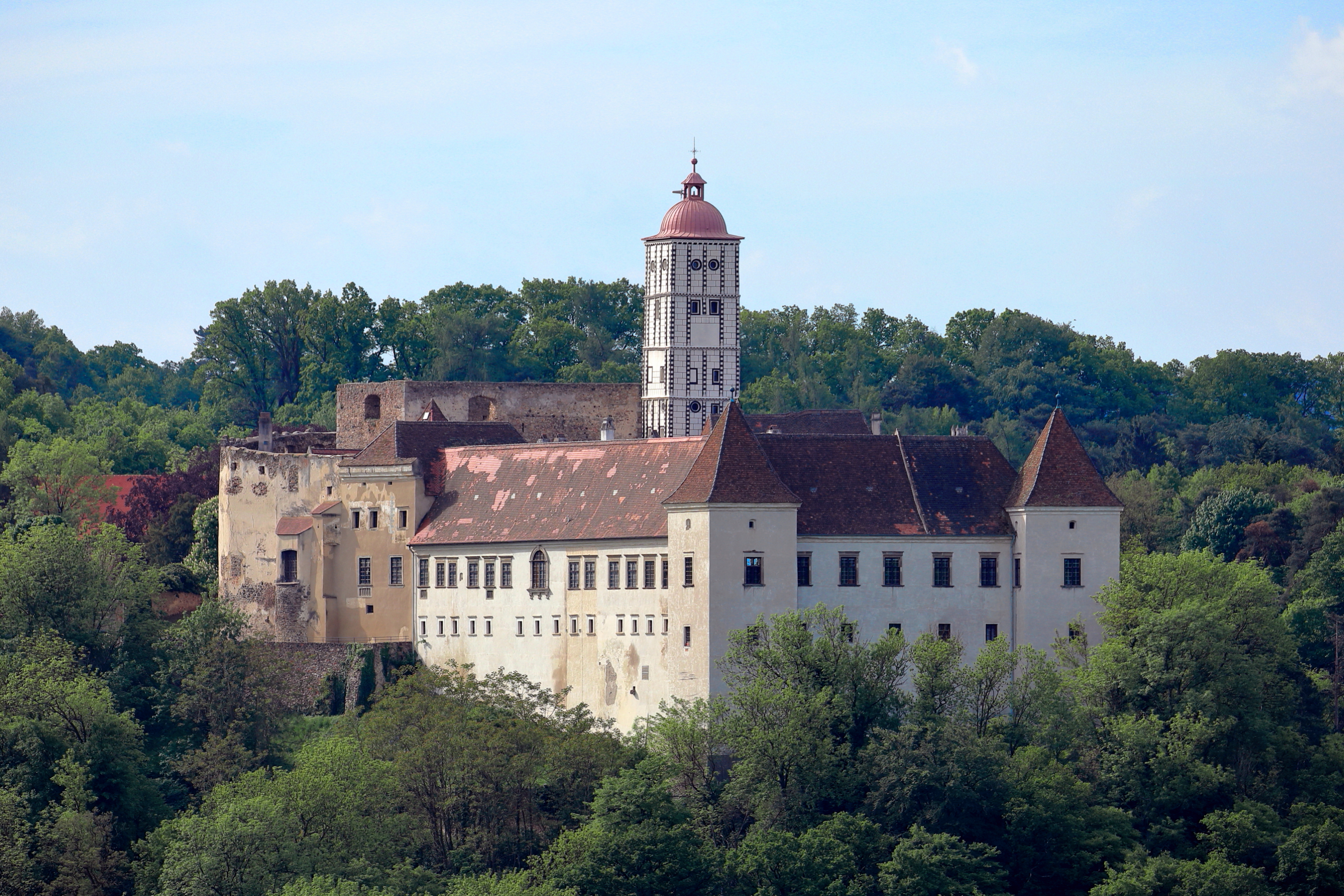
- Schallaburg Castle in Schollach

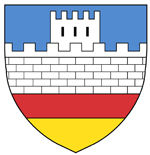
- Coat of arms

- Location within Austria
- Coordinates: 48°11′N 15°21′E
- Country: Austria
- State: Lower Austria
- District: Melk

Government
  - Mayor: Norbert Gleiss

Area
  - Total: 19.69 km^{2} (7.60 sq mi)
- Elevation: 241 m (791 ft)

Population (2018-01-01)
  - Total: 976
  - Density: 49.6/km^{2} (128/sq mi)
- Time zone: UTC+1 (CET)
  - Summer (DST): UTC+2 (CEST)
- Postal code: 3382
- Area code: 02754
- Website: www.schollach.at

Schollach is a town in the Wachau valley in the district of Melk in the Austrian state of Lower Austria. It contains the Schallaburg Castle.

== Population ==
Historical population
Year	Pop.	±%
1971	817	—
1981	801	−2.0%
1991	846	+5.6%
2001	899	+6.3%
