= Monumenta Historica Societatis Iesu =

The Monumenta Historica Societatis Iesu (MHSI) is a collection of scholarly volumes (157 to this day) on critically edited documents on the origin and early years of the Society of Jesus, including the life and writings of St Ignatius of Loyola. It is one of four collections run by the Jesuit Historical Institute.

== Origin ==
Prompted by General Congregation XXIV of 1892, which recommended to the Superior General that writing the Society of Jesus’ history be resumed, the newly elected Luis Martin embarked on a vast project of having first published critical editions of documents on the origins of the Society available in the archives of the Order. A team of experts was appointed and a first volume of the MHSI was published in Madrid in 1894. When the Jesuit Historical Institute was established in Rome in 1930, the work was carried on from there. It could be said that this was also stimulated by the renewal of historical research methods that characterised the end of the 19th century.

== Short survey of published volumes ==
=== Writings of St Ignatius of Loyola ===
1. Epistolae et Instructiones (Letters and Instructions) : 12 volumes.
2. Exercitia spiritualia (Text of the Spiritual Exercises and its Directories): 2 volumes.
3. Constitutiones et Regulae Soc. Iesu (Latin and Spanish text; preparatory documents, various sets of rules and directives): 8 volumes.
4. Fontes narrativi de Sancto Ignacio (Writings about St Ignatius by his contemporaries): 4 volumes.

=== Primary sources from Ignatius’ Contemporaries ===
1. Epistolae mixtae: 1537-1556 (Letters addressed to St. Ignatius): 5 volumes.
2. Litterae quadrimestres: 1546-1562 (Quarterly reports to the central government of the Society): 7 volumes.
3. Epistolae S.Francesci Xaverii: 1535-1552 (Letters and other writings of St Francis Xavier): 2 volumes.
4. Documents, letters, etc., of the early companions of St Ignatius: Favre (1 vol.), Salmeron (2 vol.), Broet, Codure, Le Jay, Rodrigues (1 vol.), Bobadilla (1 vol.), Ribadeneyra (2 vol.), Polanco (2 vol.)
5. Commentarii de Instituto Societatis Iesu (Jerome Nadal’s instructions on the Constitutions): 2 volumes.

=== On Jesuit Education ===
Monumenta paedagogica Societatis Iesu: 1540-1616 (Ratio Studiorum and its preparatory documents): 7 volumes.

=== 'Monumenta' Countrywise ===
1. Monumenta anticae Hungariae:1550-1600 (Hungary): 4 volumes.
2. Catalogi Provinciae Austriae:1551-1640 (Austria): 2 volumes.
3. Monumenta Angliae:1541-1662 (England): 3 volumes.
4. Monumenta Peruana:1565-1604 (Peru): 8 volumes.
5. Monumenta mexicanae:1570-1605 (Mexico): 8 volumes.
6. Monumenta Brasiliae: 1538-1565 (Brazil): 5 volumes.
7. Monumenta Novae Franciae:1602-1661 (French Canada): 9 volumes.
8. Documenta indica:1540-1597 (India): 18 volumes.
9. Monumenta Historiae Japoniae:1547-1562 (Japan):3 volumes.
10. Documenta Malucensia:1542-1682 (Moluccan islands): 3 volumes.
11. Monumenta Proximis Orientis:1523-1700 (Middle-East): 5 volumes.
12. Monumenta Sinica:1546-1562 (China): 1 volume.

== Today ==
Up to 2005 some 157 volumes have been published. The work goes on, and is supplemented by other topical studies published in the Bibliotheca instituti historici Societatis Iesu (54 volumes).

In 2005, the Historical Institute created the Monumenta’s Nova series of essays and monographs.
