= Wlodimir Ledóchowski =

Superior General of the Society of Jesus from 1915 to 1942

The Very Reverend Włodzimierz Halka Ledóchowski SJ
- 26th Superior General of the Society of Jesus
- Installed: 11 February 1915
- Term ended: 13 December 1942
- Predecessor: Franz Xavier Wernz
- Successor: Jean-Baptiste Janssens

Personal details
- Born: Włodzimierz Halka Ledóchowski; 7 October 1866 Loosdorf, Austrian Empire
- Died: 13 December 1942 (aged 76) Rome, Italy
- Buried: Campo Verano, Rome
- Denomination: Roman Catholic
- Parents: Count Antoni Halka Ledóchowski, Countess Joséphine Salis-Zizers
- Education: Theresianum, Jagiellonian University, Gregorianum
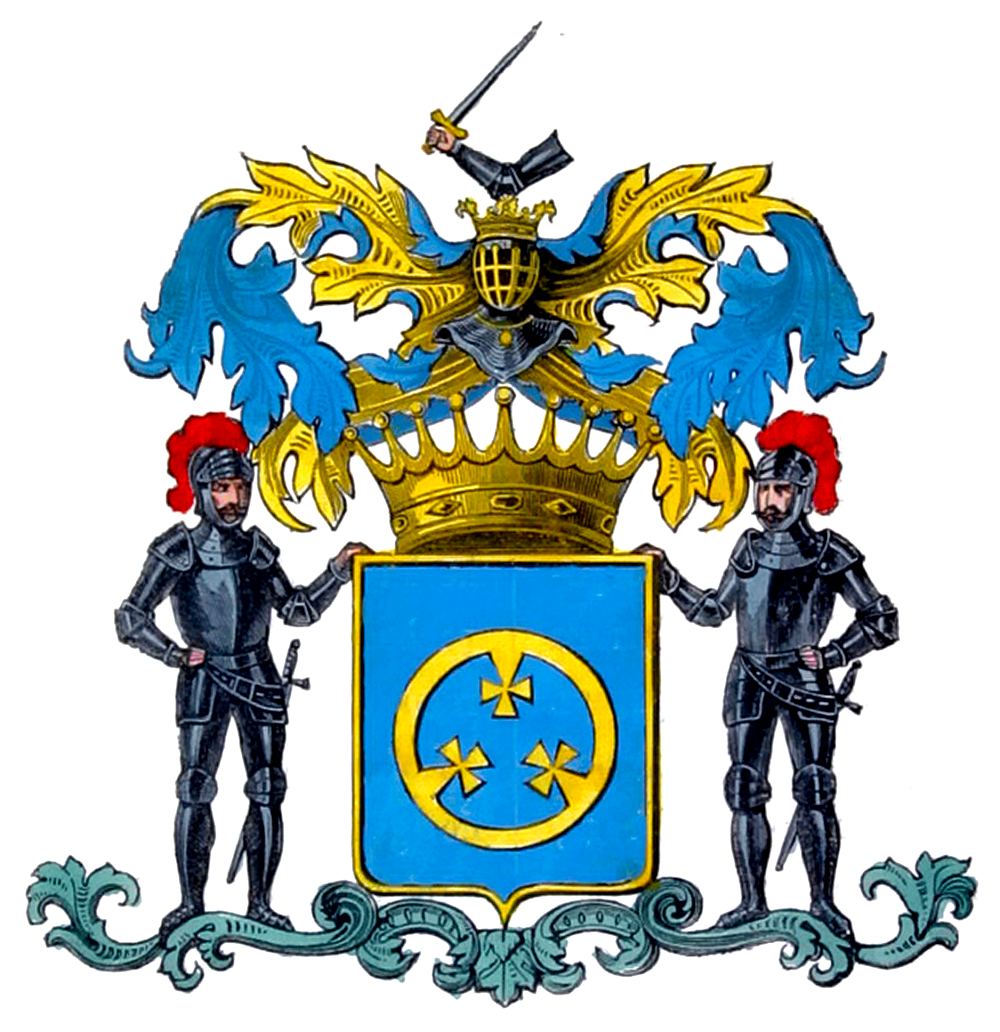
- Coat of arms: Włodzimierz Halka Ledóchowski's coat of arms

Włodzimierz Halka Ledóchowski (7 October 1866 – 13 December 1942) was a Polish Catholic priest who served as the 26th superior general of the Society of Jesus from 11 February 1915 until his death. Prior to taking holy orders, he was briefly a page to Empress Elizabeth.

== Early life ==
He was one of nine children of Count Antoni Halka Ledóchowski and the Swiss Countess Joséphine née Salis-Zizers. He was born in a manor house built by his father in Loosdorf, near St. Pölten, Lower Austria. His uncle was Mieczysław Cardinal Halka-Ledóchowski, and two of his sisters entered the religious life and have become known as Saint Maria Ursula of Jesus and Blessed Maria Teresa Ledóchowska. His brother, Ignacy Kazimierz Ledóchowski, was a general in the Polish Army.

Ledóchowski studied first at the Theresianum, in Vienna, and was for a time a page to Empress Elizabeth. He went on to study law at the Jagellonian University in Kraków. He discerned a religious vocation and turned to studies for the priesthood. While attending the Gregorian University, in Rome, he applied to join the Jesuits and entered the Society of Jesus in 1889. Five years later, he was ordained a priest. At first, he took to writing, but he was soon made Superior of the Jesuit house in Kraków and then Rector of the College. He became the Polish Vice-Provincial in 1901 and Provincial of Southern Poland in 1902. From 1906 to February 1915, he was an assistant in the German province.

== Superior-General of the Jesuits ==
After the death of Franz Xavier Wernz in August 1914, 49-year-old Ledóchowski became a candidate for the leadership of his order. He was elected the 26th Superior General on 11 February 1915 on the second ballot.

Despite the serial upheavals of the First World War, the Second World War and the economic Depression of the 1930s, the Jesuits increased in number during Ledóchowski's term of office. He called the 27th General Congregation to take place at the Collegium Germanicum to acquaint his order with the new code of canon law (promulgated in 1917) and to bring the Jesuit constitution into line with it. He called another congregation (the 28th) between 12 March and 9 May 1937 for the purpose of appointing a vicar general, as with the effects of age, he sought assistance.

He established the Pontifical Oriental Institute and the Pontifical Russian College and the Institutum Biblicum of the Gregorian University. He extracted a certain emancipation for the Society of Jesus after the Concordat between the church and the Italian government was ratified. Property was returned to the Jesuits, making it possible for them to build a new building for the Gregorian University, transferring from the Palazzo Gabrielli-Borromeo, on Via del Seminario, to Piazza Pilotta, near the Quirinal Palace. He then had built the new Curia Generalis in the rione of Borgo on property acquired from the Holy See on Borgo Santo Spirito, close to Saint Peter's Square. The concordat is credited with giving new life to the Society of Jesus, whose real estate increased, along with its influence and reputation.

== Nazi era ==
=== Divided opinions ===
According to David Kertzer's 2014 book The Pope and Mussolini: The Secret History of Pius XI and the Rise of Fascism in Europe, during the rise of fascism in Italy under Benito Mussolini, Ledóchowski exhibited strong antisemitic and pro-fascist sympathies. Kertzer writes that Ledóchowski worked to promote antsemitism in the Vatican and to align it with Italy's and Germany's racist and expansionist ambitions: "The Jesuit leader [Ledochowski] made no secret of his enthusiasm for the Fascist regime. From the time when Mussolini came to power, he [Ledochowski] had done what he could to stamp out Church opposition to the Duce". Kertzer further states that "in early 1936, the Italian ambassador told Ledochowski that Mussolini wanted America [the US Jesuit magazine] anti-Fascist editor fired and a pro-Fascist editor put in his place. ... Ledochowski accommodated him readily. ... Soon a new editor was in place, suitably enthusiastic about the Fascist cause". Furthermore, "Pignatti [the Italian ambassador] remarked that Italy's enemies were the Church's enemies. Ledochowski agreed. The attacks on Mussolini for waging war in Ethiopia, he [Ledochowski] replied were simply a 'pretext from which international Judaism is profiting in order to advance its attack on western civilization'".

Kertzer writes that there is evidence that in 1937 or 1938, Ledóchowski personally intervened to water down an encyclical against racism that was being prepared for the Pope by a fellow Jesuit, the American John LaFarge Jr. Later discoveries of versions of the text for the planned encyclical and a series of interviews with living participants in the drafting of the document in the 1960s and the 1970s seem to confirm Ledóchowski's reluctance to see anything published that was too critical of the German government.

Kertzer notes, "Ledochowski viewed the Jews as enemies of the Church and of European civilization, and he would do all he could to prevent the Pope from slowing the anti-Semitic wave that was sweeping Europe". Kertzer documents many other instances in which Ledóchowski and other Jesuits led and manipulated the Vatican and the Church into supporting Mussolini and the infamous racist laws against the Jews.

=== Support for Allied resistance ===
According to the Jesuit historian Vincent A. Lapomarda, there was "no doubt" about Ledóchowski's concern to thwart Nazi Germany in Europe once it had invaded Poland:

"Even if he had at one time entertained, as alleged by one historian, the conception of a union of a Catholic bloc in Europe against the Communists in the East and the Protestants in the West, events had dramatically altered that vision".

Ledóchowski accurately surmised Adolf Hitler's perfidious nature; predicted the Hitler–Stalin Pact; used the Jesuit-run Vatican Radio service to broadcast condemnations of Nazi crimes in Poland, which led to protests by the German government; and assisted underground resistance movements in occupied Europe. The Nazi persecution of the Catholic Church in Poland was particularly severe, and Lapomarda notes that Ledóchowski helped "stiffen the general attitude of the Jesuits against the Nazis"; helped Vatican Radio, which was run by the Jesuit Filippo Soccorsi; and spoke out against Nazi oppression, particularly with regard to Poland, and against Vichy France's antisemitism.

== Death ==
Ledóchowski died in Rome on 13 December 1942, aged 76. After his funeral in the Church of the Gesù, his remains were interred in the Society's mausoleum at Campo Verano, on the eastern edge of Rome.

== Appraisal ==
Nicholas Murray Butler, who met Ledóchowski in 1930, later wrote that "in Rome I was told that Father Ledóchowski would rank as one of the two or three greatest heads of the Jesuit Order".

== See also ==
- Ledóchowski, overview of the a Ledóchowski family
- Ursula Ledóchowska, the canonized sister of Włodzimierz Ledóchowski
- Maria Teresia Ledóchowska, the beatified sister of Włodzimierz Ledóchowski
- Michel d'Herbigny, Jesuit who led a mission to the Soviet Union

Catholic Church titles
Preceded by Franz Xavier Wernz	Superior General of the Society of Jesus; 1915–1942	Succeeded by Jean-Baptiste Janssens
