= Schallaburg Castle =

Castle in Austria

Coordinates: 48.1890°N 15.3559°E

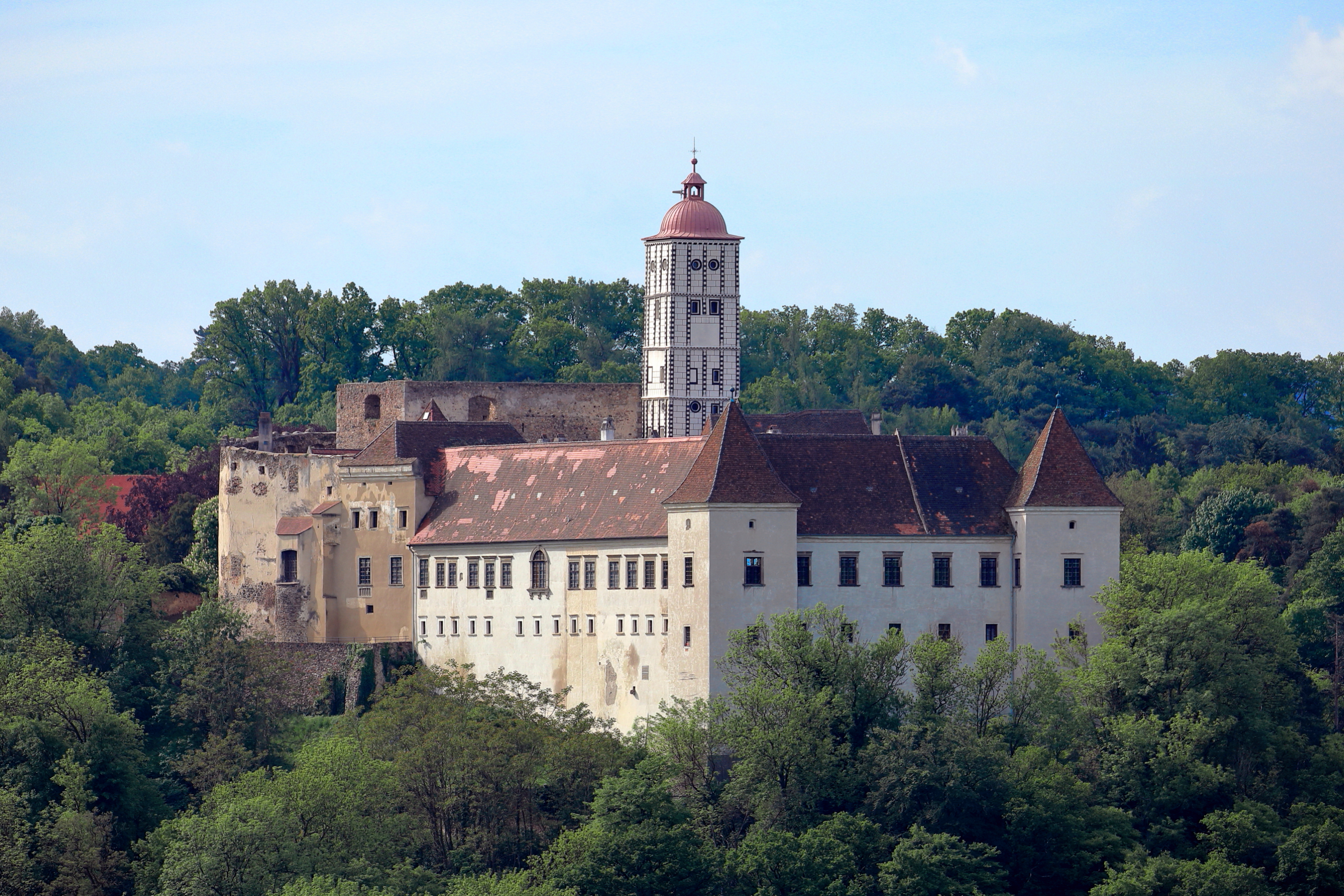
Schallaburg

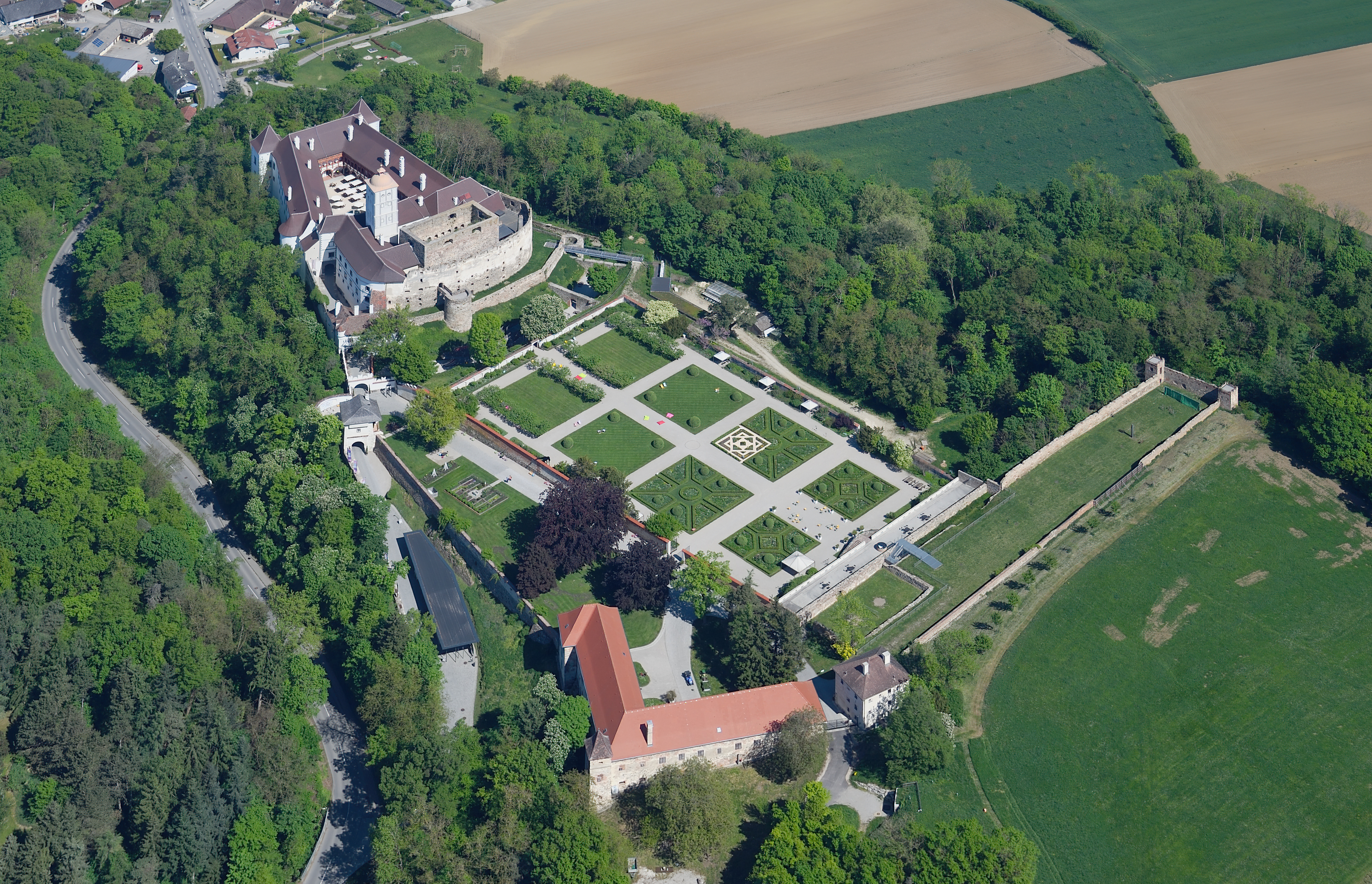
Aerial view of Schallaburg Castle, showing the Renaissance garden terrace that once served as the castle's knights' tournament court

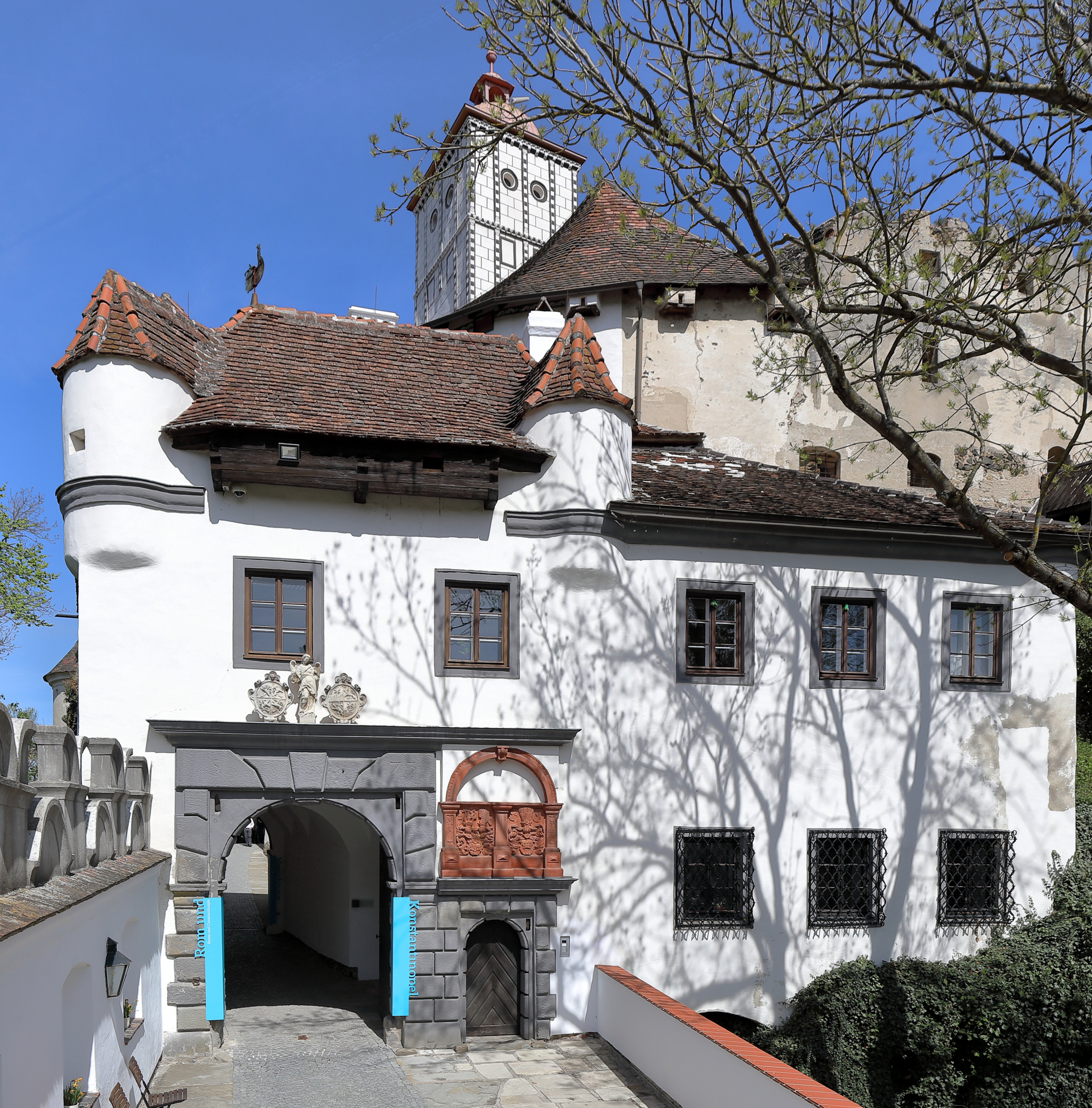

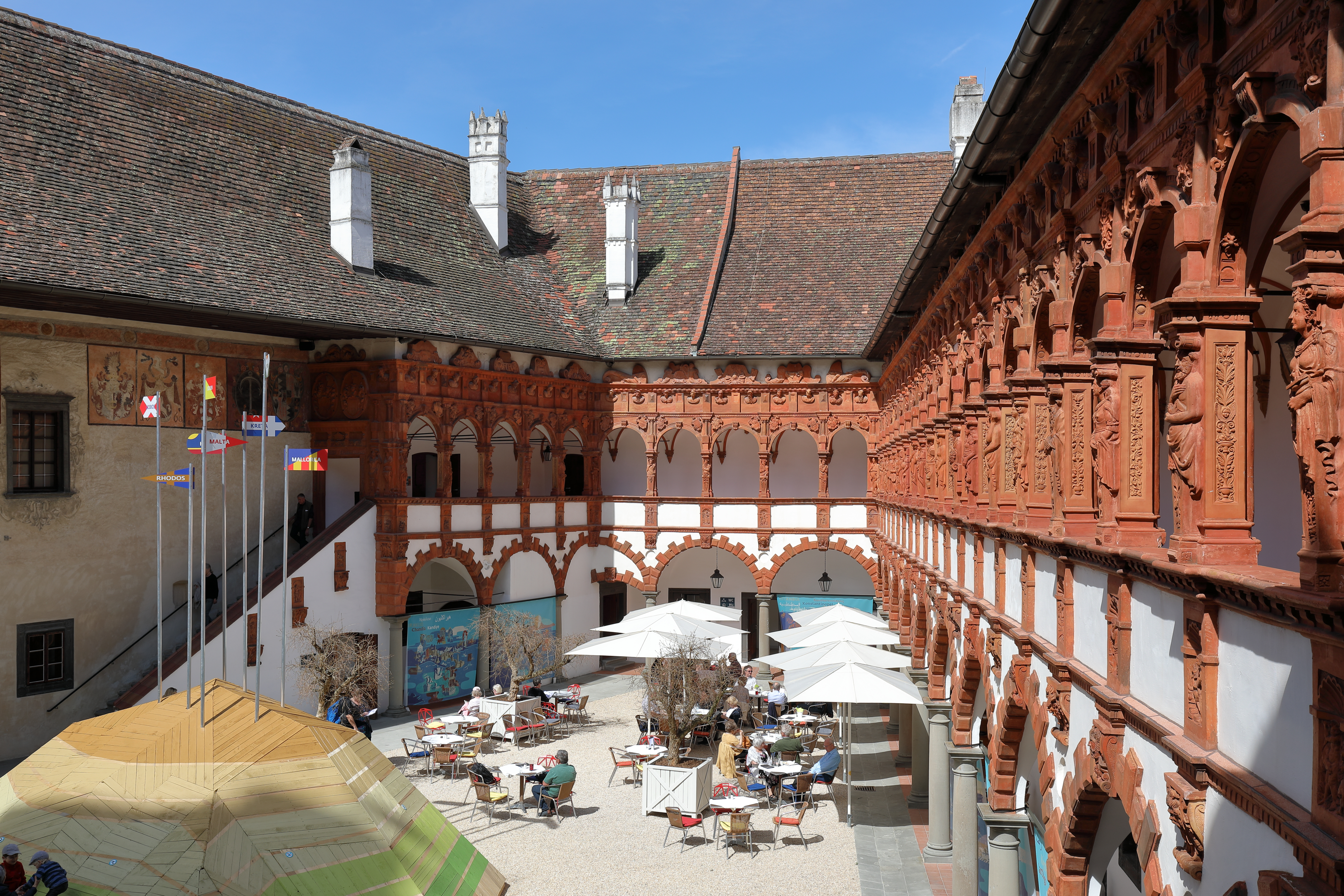

Schallaburg Castle is a castle in the village of Schallaburg in the municipality of Schollach, near the Wachau valley, Lower Austria, north of the Alps. Schallaburg Renaissance Castle is 5 kilometres (3 mi) from Melk, in the region known as Mostviertel. The central part of the castle was built in the German Renaissance Age, beginning around 1540, by the Losenstein dynasty.

== History of the castle Schallaburg ==
In 1242, the castle appears in a document for the first time mentioned as fortress Schala. From the 13th to the 15th century the castle was owned by the lords of Zelking (German: von Zelking). From 1456 until 1614, castle Schallaburg was in the possession of the family von Losenstein. In the 16th century Hans Wilhelm von Losenstein renovated it into a Renaissance style, and rebuilt the church of Loosdorf into a Renaissance Lutheran church. There he also founded a Lutheran grammar school for youths of both nobility and non-nobility ('die Hohe Schule', 1574-1627). In 1601 Hans Wilhelm von Losenstein died, resulting in rested high debts on the castle. In 1614 the father-in-law of George Christoph auf Losensteinleithen, George von Stubenberg, bought the castle. In 1627 the church and school were closed according to a law issued by the archduke of Austria emperor Ferdinand II, who wished to restore the Catholic faith in Lower Austria. From the 17th century until the 20th, the castle changed owners several times. It remained private property until 1945. In 1945 it was confiscated by the Russians, and then in 1955 the castle became property of the new Republic of Austria.

== Description ==
The castle is combination of a Romanesque residential castle and a Gothic chapel, patterned in the Italian Renaissance style. Aesthetically built, it has a well-decorated two-storied arcaded court with elegant cantilevered staircases and a courtyard. The decorations are in terracotta mosaic depicting mythological figures, gods, masks and human beings and animals; a legendary mythical figurine here is known as Hundefräulein (a female human figure with a dog's head).

At the gate entrance to the castle, there are two large "smoke-spewing dragons", each 30 metres (98 ft) long and 6 metres (20 ft) high, which is a favourite entertainment spot for the children to slide down its mouth from the top. Its culturally rich Mannerist gardens have roses, ornamental trees and bushes and herbs planted in the gardens in the town, and two Renaissance apple orchards.

== Schallaburg ==
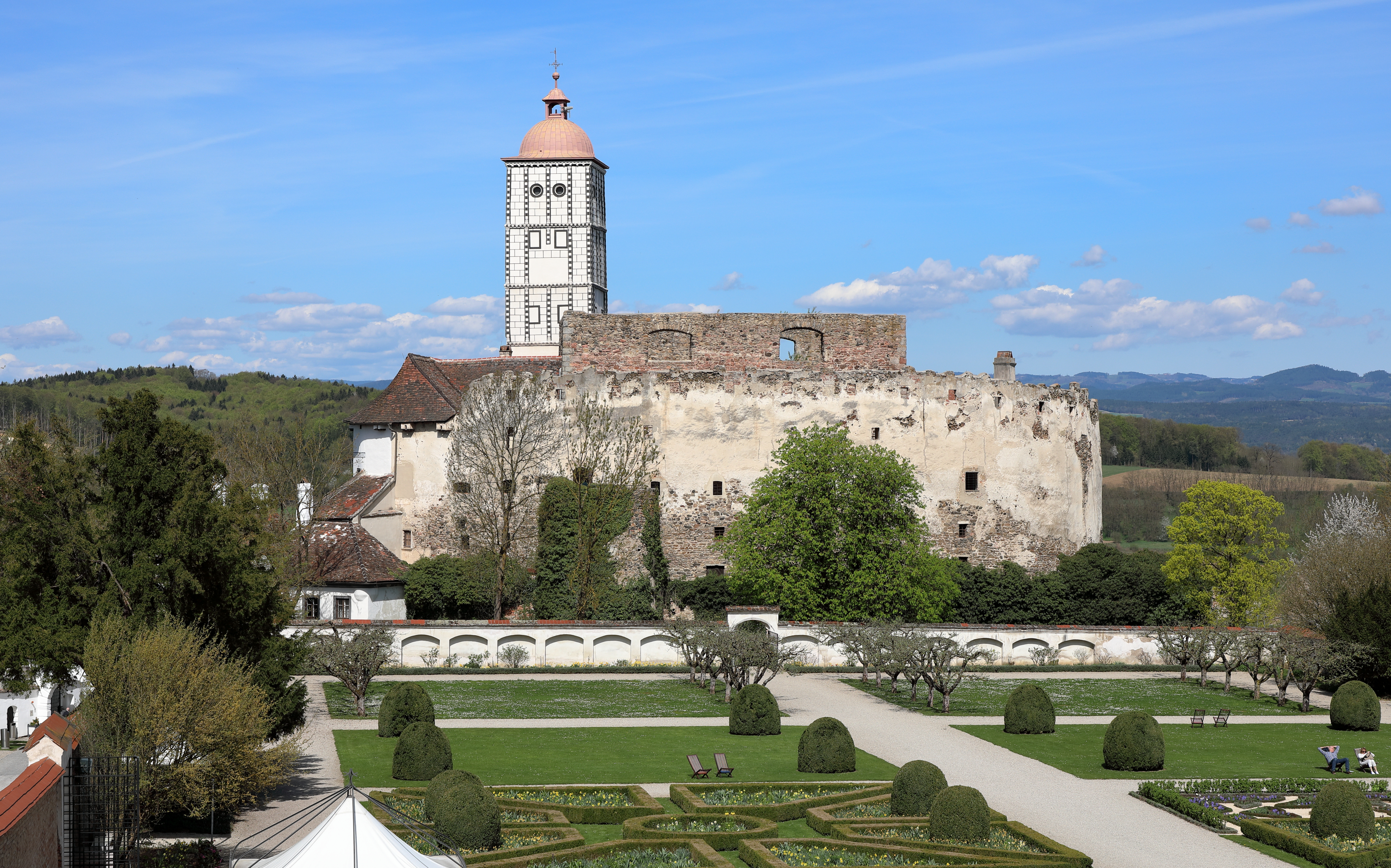
Southeast side of Schallaburg

Schallaburg is a village in the municipality of Schollach, in Lower Austria. Schallaburg is situated at an altitude of 310 m. The Schallaburg Castle is one of the best known Renaissance style castles in Austria. Today the castle functions as a museum.

=== Museum Schallaburg ===
In 1967 the government of Lower Austria bought the castle from the Austrian state. The government of Lower Austria decided to renovate the Schallaburg. In 1968 the restoration started with the roof. In 1974 the Schallaburg was opened as a museum for Lower Austria.

The topic of the first exhibition of museum Schallaburg in 1974 was the Renaissance. Every year there is a new exhibition; the exhibition of 2011 was on the history of Venice, the one of 2012 about Byzantium. On March 29, 2014 an exhibition on the First World War called "Glory and Gloom - living with the Great War 1914-1918" was opened. The exhibition showed weapons, movies, historical posters, post cards from particulars and other items from that time. In 2015 the Vikings were the topic of the annual exhibition.
