= Congregation of the Ursulines of the Agonizing Heart of Jesus =

Catholic religious institute

The Congregation of the Ursulines of the Agonizing Heart of Jesus (Polish: Zgromadzenie Sióstr Urszulanek Serca Jezusa Konającego), also known as the Grey Ursulines, is a Catholic religious institute founded by Ursula Ledóchowska in Poland. At present the congregation consists of over 900 sisters in 14 countries. The sisters are committed to the service of poor people and specialize in providing educational opportunities.

== History ==
During World War II the Ursulines' convent in Warsaw ran a soup kitchen for orphaned or abandoned children in central Warsaw. The sisters were also active in efforts to obtain “Aryan” documents for the Jewish children, protect those who looked Jewish, and hide them during German raids. In 1997, Yad Vashem recognized Sr. Andrzeja Górska as Righteous Among the Nations. During the German occupation of Warsaw, Górska saved the lives of many Jewish children by smuggling them out of the ghetto, and transferring them to institutions belonging to the Ursuline Sisters, which had branches throughout occupied Poland.

The first convent in North America was established in Windsor, Ontario in 1965. There the sisters are involved in teaching the Polish language and culture, and cultivating Polish customs and traditions. They also teach in Canadian elementary and secondary schools.

As of 2020, the congregation consists of over 900 sisters in 100 communities in 14 countries on five continents: Argentina, Belarus, Brazil, Canada, Finland, France, Germany, Italy, the Philippines, Poland, Tanzania, Ukraine, Bolivia and Russia. The motherhouse and shrine of St. Ursula Ledóchowska is located in Pniewy. The generalate is in Rome.

== Notable members ==
- Ancilla Chodkowska (1905–1944), medic of the Warsaw Uprising
- Andrzeja Górska (1917–2007), a Righteous Among the Nations
- Zofia Zdybicka (1928–2026), philosopher on metaphysics and religion
