= Mieczysław Halka-Ledóchowski =

Polish Roman Catholic cardinal-priest (1822–1902)

His Eminence Mieczysław Halka-Ledóchowski
- Prefect of the Congregation for the Propagation of the Faith
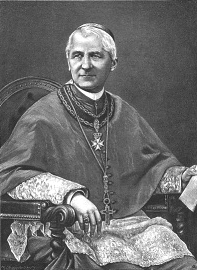
- Church: Roman Catholic Church
- Appointed: 26 January 1892
- Term ended: 22 July 1902
- Predecessor: Giovanni Simeoni
- Successor: Girolamo Maria Gotti
- Other posts: Cardinal-Protector of the Pontifical Ecclesiastical Academy (1896–1902); Cardinal-Priest of San Lorenzo in Lucina (1896–1902); Protopriest (1899–1902)
- Previous posts: Apostolic Delegate to Colombia (1856–61); Apostolic Delegate to Venezuela (1856–61); Apostolic Delegate to Ecuador (1856–61); Apostolic Delegate to Peru (1856–61); Apostolic Delegate to Bolivia (1856–61); Titular Archbishop of Thebae (1861–66); Apostolic Nuncio to Belgium (1861–66); Archbishop of Gniezno (1866–86); Archbishop of Poznań (1866–86); Cardinal-Priest of Santa Maria in Ara Coeli (1876–96); Camerlengo of the College of Cardinals (1884–85)

Orders
- Ordination: 13 July 1845 by Luigi Lambruschini
- Consecration: 3 November 1861 by Camillo di Pietro
- Created cardinal: 15 March 1875 by Pope Pius IX
- Rank: Cardinal-Priest

Personal details
- Born: Mieczysław Halka-Ledóchowski; 29 October 1822 Górki, Congress Poland
- Died: 22 July 1902 (aged 79) Rome, Kingdom of Italy
- Buried: Campo Verano (1902–27); Poznań Cathedral
- Parents: Josef Ledóchowski; Maria Rosalia Zakrzewska
- Education: Pontifical Academy of Ecclesiastical Nobles; Collegio Romano
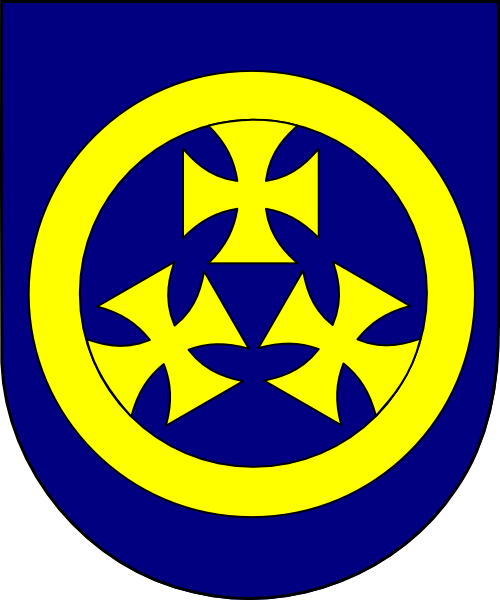
- Coat of arms

Styles of Mieczysław Ledóchowski
- Reference style: His Eminence
- Spoken style: Your Eminence
- Informal style: Cardinal
- See: Poznań and Gniezno

Mieczysław Halka-Ledóchowski (IPA: /mʲɛˈtʂɨswaf ˈxalka lɛduˈxɔfski/; 29 October 1822 – 22 July 1902) was a Polish Roman Catholic cardinal-priest. He was born in Górki in Russian-controlled Congress Poland to Count Josef Ledóchowski and Maria Zakrzewska. He was uncle to Saint Ursula Ledóchowska, the Blessed Maria Teresia (Theresa) Ledóchowska and Father Włodzimierz Ledóchowski, General Superior of the Society of Jesus.

== Early life ==
Born 29 October 1822, he was named after Mieszko I, the first Christian prince of Poland. After studying at Radom, at the age of nineteen, he entered the seminary at Warsaw run by the Missionaries of St. Vincent de Paul. He then studied at the Gregorian University in Rome and entered the Jesuit Accademia dei Nobili Ecclesiastici to prepare to work in the diplomatic corps of the Holy See. Ledóchowski was ordained priest on 13 July 1845. He earned two doctorates, in theology and civil and canon law.

== Diplomatic career ==
Father Ledóchowski became domestic prelate of Pope Pius IX in 1846, and in 1847 auditor of the papal nunciature at Lisbon. In 1857 he became papal delegate in Bogotá for an area that encompassed present-day Colombia, Venezuela, Ecuador, Peru and Bolivia. In 1861, he was named titular archbishop of Thebes and papal nuncio at Brussels.

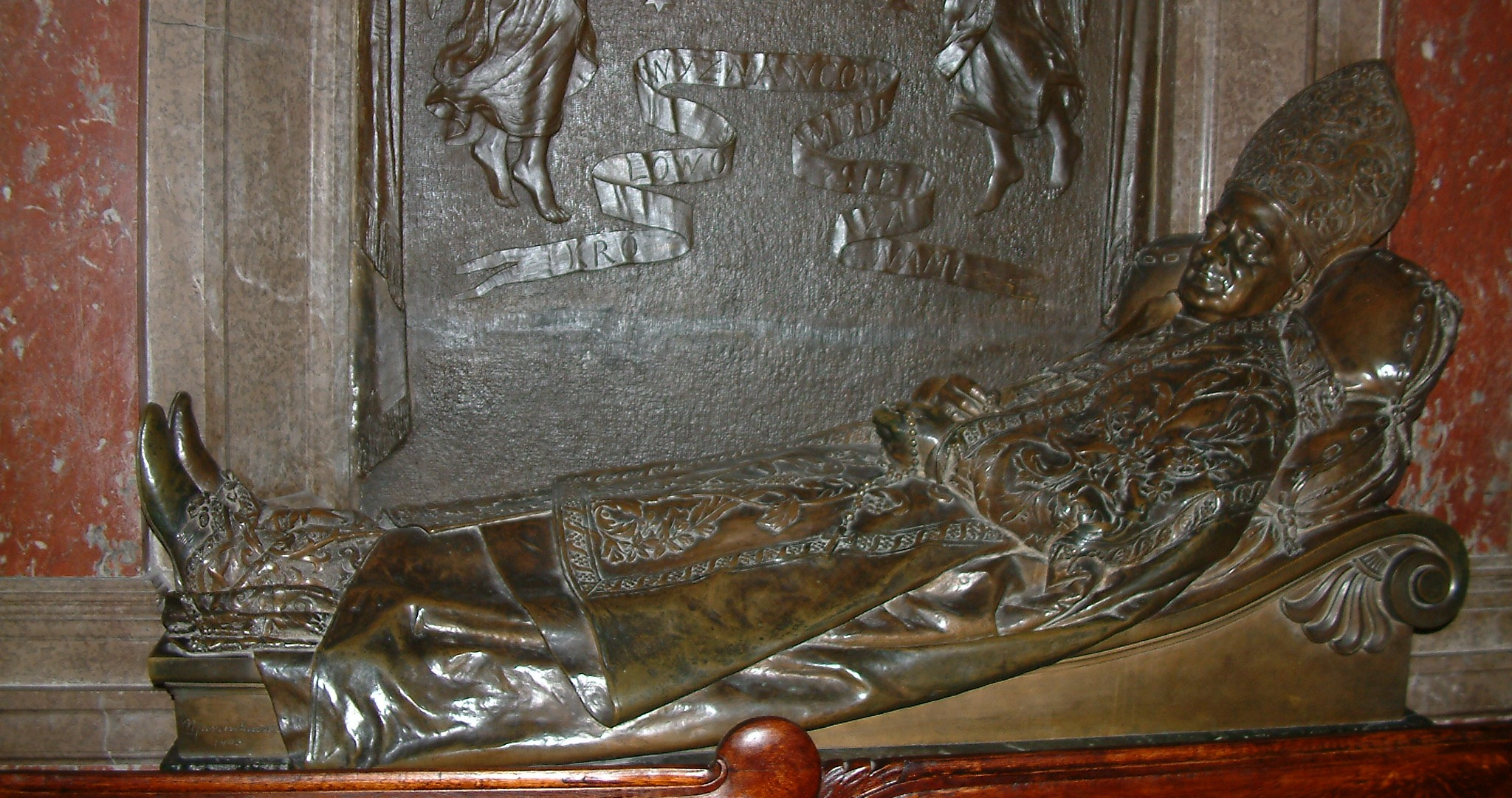
Tomb of Cardinal Ledóchowski in Archcathedral Basilica of St. Peter and St. Paul, Poznań

== Primate ==
After returning to Poland in 1864, he was named coadjutor with right of succession to Primate Leon Przyłuski, and two years later, upon Przyłuski's death, despite the opposition of the Prussian authorities, he was appointed archbishop of Gniezno and Archbishop of Poznań, (both cities then a part of the Prussian Province of Posen).

In 1873, the Prussian government began the implementation of Kulturkampf policies against the Roman Catholic Church and Polish culture, the Polish language in particular. In the aftermath, the Prussian government forbade the use of Polish in instruction in the Province of Posen. Archbishop Ledóchowski urgently protested the order and ultimately issued a circular ordering the religion teachers at higher educational institutes to use the German language in their teachings to the higher classes but to preserve Polish in their teachings to the lower classes.

The religious instructors obediently followed the archbishop's order and were subsequently deposed by the Prussian government. Ledóchowski's refusal to cede control of the seminaries of Gniezno and Poznan to the Prussian authorities eventually led to their closure. After repeated fines for outlawed activity, the government demanded Ledóchowski's resignation. The archbishop responded that no temporal court could deprive him of an office granted to him by God, and he was jailed in the Ostrów Wielkopolski prison in February 1874.

In March 1875, the Pope appointed him as a cardinal. Ledóchowski was released and banished and thereafter ruled his see from Rome through secret emissaries. Towards the end of his life he began to have serious vision problems of cataracts. He resigned in 1885. In 1892 he became Prefect of the Congregation for the Evangelization of Peoples, an office which he held until his death, on 22 July 1902.

== See also ==
- Our Lady of La Salette
- Wlodimir Ledóchowski
