= Luis Martín =

Spanish Jesuit (1846–1906)

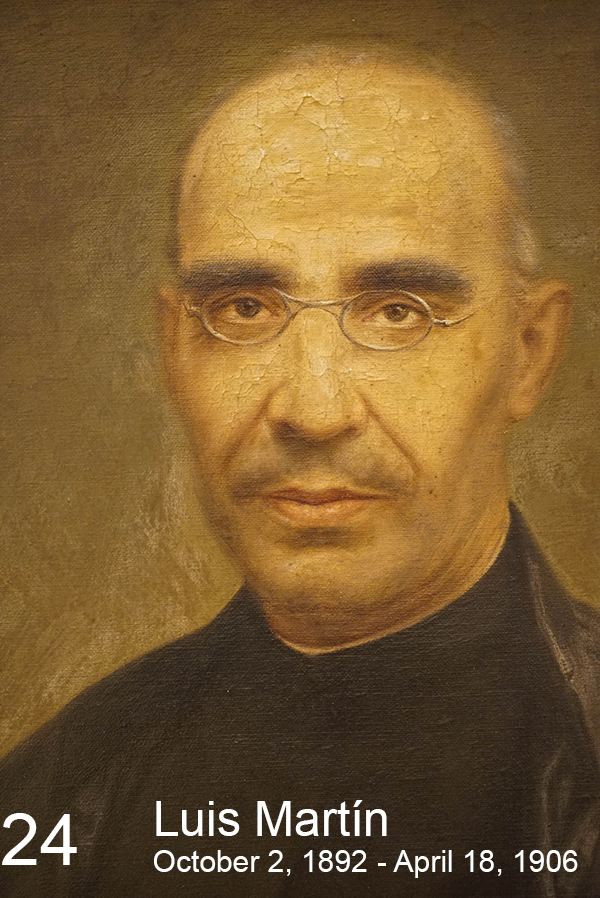

Luis Martín García (19 August 1846 – 18 April 1906) was a Spanish Jesuit, elected the twenty-fourth Superior General of the Society of Jesus.

== Early years and formation ==
The third of six brothers, Martín was born of humble parentage in Melgar de Fernamental. After primary education in his own village he entered the seminary of Burgos in 1858, where he spent six years. His intellectual inclination led him to join the Society of Jesus in 1864. He began his philosophy studies in Léon, but revolution in Spain and anti-clericalism forced him to move to France where he completed his courses, first in Vals, and then in Poyanne. There, he also taught humanities and rhetoric before doing his theology (1873–77). He was ordained on 14 September 1876.

== Professor and rector ==
Soon after the anti-religious law of Ferry (1880) compelled Jesuits to leave France. Fortunately the restoration of the Spanish monarchy in the 1870s had now made it possible to repatriate Jesuits back to Spain. On his return to Castile, Martín, though a man of letters, was redirected towards the Biblical studies and teaching. He became was made Rector of the Seminary of Salamanca from 1880 to 1884, then director of the journal El Mensajero del Corazon de Jesus, followed by the appointment as Superior of the Centre of Superior studies of Deusto-Bilbao (the future University of Deusto).

== Provincial of Castile ==
As Rector of the seminary of Salamanca he had shown qualities of leadership and commitment to spiritual and intellectual formation that led the Superior General to appoint him Provincial of Castile in 1886. He handled tactfully the deep divisions between Carlists and Integrists that were plaguing Catholics in Spain - particularly in the Basque area - including the Jesuits.

== Called to Rome: Vicar General ==
Martin was called to Rome by Anton Anderledy to first pilot a projected document of studies in the Society. A few hours before his death in 1892, Anderledy made him Vicar General of the Society, effectively entrusting him with the calling and organizing the General Congregation that would elect a new Superior General. The political tension between the Church and the new Kingdom of Italy was making it difficult for the Congregation to meet in Italy. Martin obtained from Pope Leo XIII that the Congregation meet in Loyola, (Spain). This is the only General Congregation to have met outside Italy.

== General Congregation XXIV ==
The 24th General congregation opened on 24 September 1892. Martin was elected on the second ballot (42 on 70) and declared Superior General (2 October). The Congregation over, Martín took a round-about route back to Fiesole, Italy in order to visit France, England, Ireland, Belgium and Germany. This was his only visit to countries which would provide many of the problems of his Generalate. Martin's problems in dealing with Northern European Jesuits can be better understood if one remembers that the Jesuit dissidents with whom he was familiar in Spain were of the reactionary and anti-intellectual type. This experience did little to prepare him to understand the more liberal ideas of northern European Jesuits.

== Martin’s government ==
- Committing himself to govern ad mentem congregationis Martin wrote several letters to the whole Society that were expression of a concern voiced by the Congregation's fathers: a letter on Religious Discipline (respecting the religious enclosure) (1893), and two (1894 and 1895) on the Temporal Administration of Goods (the spirit of Religious Poverty). Other important letters echoed papal documents on the Spiritual Exercises of Ignatius of Loyola (Pope Leo XIII, in 1900) and on Biblical Studies (Pope Pius X, 1904).
- Relations with Pope Leo XIII and Pope Pius X were warm and encouraging. Given the circumstances (The loss of the Papal States was not yet accepted and the Pope was considering himself a 'Prisoner in the Vatican') Martin felt the need of giving them unsparing support, whatever initiatives they took, especially through the journal Civiltà Cattolica). Following up on a decree of the General Congregation he moved back the headquarters of the Society of Jesus from Fiesole to Rome (1895).
- In France, following on the initiative of Pope Leo XIII, he encouraged the Jesuits to reconcile themselves with the republican ideals. All over the Northern European countries he encouraged greater involvement in social questions (implementing the encyclical Rerum novarum of 1893)
- In England, in the face of strong opposition he successfully opened or reopened Jesuit schools (Wimbledon, Stamford Hill, Campion Hall, Oxford)
- He opened news missions areas (Jamaica, Honduras) entrusting them to the American Jesuits and sent a Visitor to far away Australia (1895). Peter Claver was canonized in 1888 and later (1896) declared patron saint of the missions among the Africans.
- His main concern however seems to have been his own country, Spain, where he succeeded in rooting out integrist tendencies among Jesuits in spite of the backing they were having from highly placed Vatican officials. He gave strong support to intellectual work and encouraged the launching of the journal Razon y Fe (1901).
- Historians are particularly grateful to Martin for having initiated (at the request of GC 24) a scientifically critical edition of the documents pertaining to the foundation and early years of the Society. The publication of the Monumenta Historica Societatis Iesu were started in Madrid in 1894 and carried on later in Rome. He launched also the major projects of comprehensive history of the Society in Spain (Astrain), France (Fouqueray), England (Hughes), Germany (Bernhard Duhr), Italy (Tacchi-Venturi), Belgium-Netherlands (Poncelet), Portugal, etc.
- Towards the end of his life, after the election of Pope Pius X, Martin had to face the crisis of Modernism (Roman Catholicism). Modernists were hunted and expelled from the Church. So was it for George Tyrrell, English Jesuit, who was expelled from the Society and excommunicated in 1906 in spite of Martin's intervention. Many others were condemned if not expelled. The Bollandists were also in trouble.
- Membership of the Society steadily increased during his tenure: from 13,274 when Martin took office (1892) to 15,661 in 1906.

== Illness and death ==
Even at the beginning of his term Martín's physical health had been poor and it grew steadily worse with the years. In 1905, a tumor forced the amputation of his right arm. Pope Pius X granted him permission to celebrate mass despite his disability, a privilege for which he was most grateful. The cancer, however, soon invaded his lungs and he died in Rome, on 18 April 1906.

== Writings ==
- Epistolae Selectae, Roma.
- Memorias del P. Luis Martin (ed. by J.R.Eguilor), 2 vol., Roma, 1988.

== Notes ==
Catholic Church titles
Preceded by Anton Anderledy	Superior General of the Society of Jesus; 1892–1906	Succeeded by Franz Xavier Wernz
