= Tadeusz Brzozowski =

Polish scholar, teacher and Jesuit priest

The Very Reverend Tadeusz Brzozowski SJ
- twentieth Superior General of the Society of Jesus
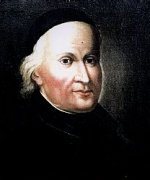
- Very Rev. Tadeusz Brzozowski
- Installed: 1805, Papal confirmation 1814
- Term ended: 5 February 1820
- Predecessor: vacat
- Successor: Luigi Fortis

Orders
- Ordination: 1775

Personal details
- Born: Tadeusz Brzozowski; 21 October 1749 Koenigsberg, Kingdom of Prussia
- Died: 5 February 1820 (aged 70) Polotsk, Russian Empire
- Buried: Polotsk, Belarus
- Denomination: Roman Catholic
- Education: Slutsk, Nieswiez, Vilnius University
- Coat of arms: Korab

Tadeusz Brzozowski, SJ (October 21, 1749 – February 5, 1820) was a Polish scholar, teacher, administrator and a Jesuit priest. Having secured its continuity during the suppression of the Society until its restoration, he was elected twentieth Superior General of the Society of Jesus and was its first world-wide general.

== Background ==
Brzozowski was born in Königsberg, Kingdom of Prussia, on October 21, 1749, into a Polish family. He entered the Society of Jesus in 1765, and studied Rhetoric, Greek, French and classical literature in Slutsk (Belarus) (1767–70), followed by Philosophy and Mathematics in Nieśwież (1770–73). After the Suppression of the Order in the rest of the world on 21 July 1773 (owing to Catherine the Great, patron of "her" Jesuits, it did not apply in the Russian Empire), he continued his theological studies in Vilnius, where he was ordained priest in 1775. In effect he was no longer formally a member of the Society. However, as the partitions of Poland-Lithuania progressed over the next 20 years, paradoxically the range of the Jesuits expanded temporarily along with the borders of the Russian Empire.

=== Return to the Society in Russia ===
In 1782 Brzozowski left for Polotsk, Belarus in the Russian Empire, in order to be able to rejoin the Society, which was allowed to continue there. A gifted linguist (fluent in Latin, French, German, Russian) he translated theological works into his native Polish, such as, Dykcjonarz filozoficzny religii (a Philosophical Dictionary of Religion) by C. F. Nonnotte, Wilno 1782 and O naśladowaniu Najświętszej Maryi Panny (The Imitation of the Blessed Virgin Mary) by A. de Rouville, Połock 1800. He was also a successful and well known preacher. In 1797 he was named Secretary of the Society and worked closely with Gabriel Lenkiewicz, Franciszek Kareu and Gabriel Gruber, the successive Vicars General of the Society in Russia. On their behalf he corresponded with the many ex-jesuits abroad who wished to rejoin the Society. At the Regional Congregation of 1802 he was made Assistant of the newly elected Superior of the Jesuits of the Russian Province, Gabriel Gruber. He had an especial devotion to the Jesuit martyr, Andrew Bobola and in 1808 he exhumed his remains from Pinsk and brought them for reburial in Polotsk. He expanded missionary activity in Mozdok, in the Caucasus (1806), Irkutsk (1810) and in Tomsk (1814). He also planned to send missionaries to China. In 1806-1810 he despatched eight Belarusian Jesuits to Boston to help foster the Society's revival there.

=== Superior General ===
Following the death of Gruber, in 1805, the Regional (Polish) Fourth Congregation met at Polotsk, again part of Lithuania and elected Tadeusz Brzozowski as Superior General of the Society which was still functioning in the territory of Russia. The newly elected General immediately sent a message to Pope Pius VII thanking him for having restored the Society in Sicily. By then a steady stream of young men was coming to Russia to join the Society. Between 1803 and 1805, 103 candidates entered the novitiate of Polotsk, 23 of them already ordained priests. The total number of Jesuits grew to 333, mostly engaged in educational activities, in 7 high schools in Russia, but also moving into pastoral work in Latvia and Lithuania.

It became clear that the suppression of the Society would eventually be lifted. in 1812 the college in Polotsk was upgraded by Alexander I of Russia into a university academy, thus allowing affiliation of all the Jesuit schools and affording them protection from undue local political interference.

In October 1806, the "ex-Jesuits" of Maryland in America were fully incorporated into the Society and Brzozowski allowed an American novitiate to be opened with ten novices at Georgetown. Later that year, Bishop Joseph-Octave Plessis of Québec wrote to exiled Pope Pius VII and to Brzozowski, begging for Jesuits to be sent from Great Britain both to Halifax Nova Scotia and also to work among the aboriginal people in Upper Canada. Brzozowski sent four men as requested, two from Russia and two from England, but the Napoleonic Wars in Europe and the dangers of travel made their mission impossible.

Internal tensions grew in the Society as non-Russian or Polish Jesuits, not being conversant with the political situation of the Russian empire, criticized Brzozowski for certain decisions he took which, in their estimation, were too liberal, such as allowing the Orthodox faith to be taught in Jesuit schools.

=== Restoration of the Society ===
Brzozowski worked tirelessly to obtain the general restoration of the Society, both personally and through his delegate in Rome, Father Luigi Fortis SJ. On his return from Napoleonic exile to Rome, Pope Pius VII lifted the suppression of the Society on August 7, 1814. Forty-one years after Clement XIV suppressed the Society, Pius VII celebrated mass in the Church of the Gesú, and formally promulgated the Papal bull of restoration, Sollicitudo omnium ecclesiarum. The newly reconstituted Society of Jesus deemed a general congregation unnecessary: Brzozowski retained his role and became formally Superior General of the Society of Jesus. However, Tsar Alexander prohibited Brzozowski from leaving Russia. Brzozowski therefore appointed Luigi Fortis, as his representative in Rome from 1814 until his death in 1820. Brzozowski had managed to secure the continuity of the Society from his exile in Russia.

=== Political complications ===
The Society's restoration coincided with Russia becoming more nationalistic and strengthening its native Eastern Orthodox Church. The Jesuits were seen as an obstacle to those developments. Opposed to the expansion and influence of the Society, Alexander published an edict on December 20, 1815, expelling the Jesuits from Saint Petersburg and taking over their high school on the grounds that they were converting Russian nobles to Catholicism. Despite his ailing health and protests, Brzozowski was detained and forbidden to return to Rome. Sensing that the days of the Society in Russia were numbered, Brzozowski sent several Jesuits to Western Europe to speed up the reestablishment of the order.

== Death ==
Brzozowski died on February 5, 1820, and was buried in Polotsk. He had taken the precaution to nominate an Italian, Mariano Petrucci, as his Vicar General, to ensure that the Congregation to elect his successor would meet in Rome. On 13 March 1820 the Society of Jesus was expelled from the Russian Empire.

== Bibliography ==
- Worcester SJ, T. (Ed.), (2017). Brzozowski, Tadeusz, SJ (1749–1820) in The Cambridge Encyclopedia of the Jesuits (p. 124). Cambridge: Cambridge University Press. doi:10.1017/9781139032780.002
- Inglot, M., La Compagnia di Gesù nell'impero Russo (1772–1820), Rome, 1997.
- Rouet de Journel, M.-J., La Compagnie de Jésus en Russie; un collège jésuite à Saint Petersbourg (1800–1816), Paris, 1922.
- Zalenski, S., Les Jésuites de la Russie blanche (2 vol.), Paris, 1886.

Catholic Church titles
Preceded by Gabriel Gruber	Superior General of the Society of Jesus In Exile (Russia); 1805–1814	Succeeded by restoration
Preceded by suppression	Superior General of the Society of Jesus; 1814–1820	Succeeded by Luigi Fortis
