= Luigi Fortis =

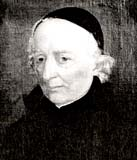
Very Rev. Luigi Fortis, S.J.

Luigi Fortis (February 26, 1748 – January 27, 1829) was an Italian Jesuit elected the twentieth Superior-General of the Society of Jesus.

== Early life and formation ==
Fortis joined the Jesuits in 1762 after studying at the San Sebastian High School of Verona: he was only 14 years old. He did his philosophical studies (1767–70) at Bologna and was busy teaching humanities at the University of Ferrara when the Society of Jesus was suppressed in 1773.

== Ex-Jesuit ==
After the suppression, Fortis returned to his home town of Verona where he got employment as a private Mathematics teacher. He pursued however his desire to become a priest and was ordained so in 1778.

In 1784, he established contacts with the Jesuits of Russia but was advised to stay in Italy where there was greater need of his services. In 1793, he passed into the Duchy of Parma where the Jesuits had obtained re-entry, and he renewed his vows as a Jesuit. For a few years, he taught Physics and History at the College of the Nobles of Parma. With the invasion of Parma by the French army in 1804 he was again a refugee, this time in Naples where the Society had been restored. His teaching in the newly opened college of Naples (1805) did not last as, with the arrival of Joseph Bonaparte as king, the Jesuits were again expelled from Naples. Fortis went to Orvieto and then returned to his home town, Verona (1810). Wherever he could, he was a teacher of Poetry, Mathematics, Philosophy and Logic.

== Restoration ==
Soon after the universal restoration of the Society (1814) Fortis was made provincial of the Jesuits in the Italian peninsula (1815–1818) and representative of the Superior General, Tadeusz Brzozowski (1814–1819), as the latter was not allowed by the czar to leave Russia.

== 20th General Congregation ==
The 20th General Congregation (following the death of Father General Tadeusz Brzozowski) was held from October 9 to December 10, 1820. The toll taken by the long years of suppression and exile was made all too evident by the intrigue and turbulence marring the Congregation. The direct intervention of Pius VII was necessary to stop the quarrels over credentials and intrigues within the Roman Curia. The Congregation finally elected Luigi Fortis as Superior General. Beside electing Fortis the Congregation's concern was to reassert without ambiguity that this was the same Society of Jesus as founded by St. Ignatius: it declared that not just the Constitutions, their Declarations, the various 'rules' but all the legislation of the previous congregations and letters of Generals of the old Society remained in effect. The new Pope Leo XII granted Father Fortis this confirmation early in his papacy. There were around 1200 Jesuits, in 6 provinces, at that time.

== Superior General ==
The new Superior General dedicated his short term of office to restoring the texture of Jesuit life as he had known it in the old Society. Fortis' letters to the whole Society describe in detail the customs which should regulate the life of the novitiates and scholasticates. One can still find little booklets from his time containing extracts from the letters of the Generals of the old Society with lists of the occasions on which they should be read aloud during meals. The principal achievement of Father Fortis and his generation of Jesuits lay in establishing beyond question the historical continuity of the restored Society with the Society founded by Ignatius that had existed until 1773.

Fortis reestablished also several provinces, including in the new world (Mexico), and three missions (Ireland, Maryland and Missouri) were depending directly on the General. Requests were coming from many places for the Jesuits to start anew the work they had been doing in the past, especially in the educational field. This prompted Fortis to initiate a revision of the Ratio Studiorum to adapt it to the thoroughly new socio-religious atmosphere of the 19th century.

In a sign of the new trust of the papacy towards the Society is the fact that Pope Leo XII returned to Jesuit management the Roman College, as well as the church of St. Ignatius, in Rome (1824).

== Death ==
After being Superior General for eight years and three months, he died in Rome on January 27, 1829. He was buried in the crypt of the Gesú. By then the Society had already 2100 members in 9 provinces.

Catholic Church titles
Preceded by Tadeusz Brzozowski	Superior General of the Society of Jesus; 1820–1829	Succeeded by Jan Roothaan
