= Anton Anderledy =

Swiss Jesuit (1819–1892)

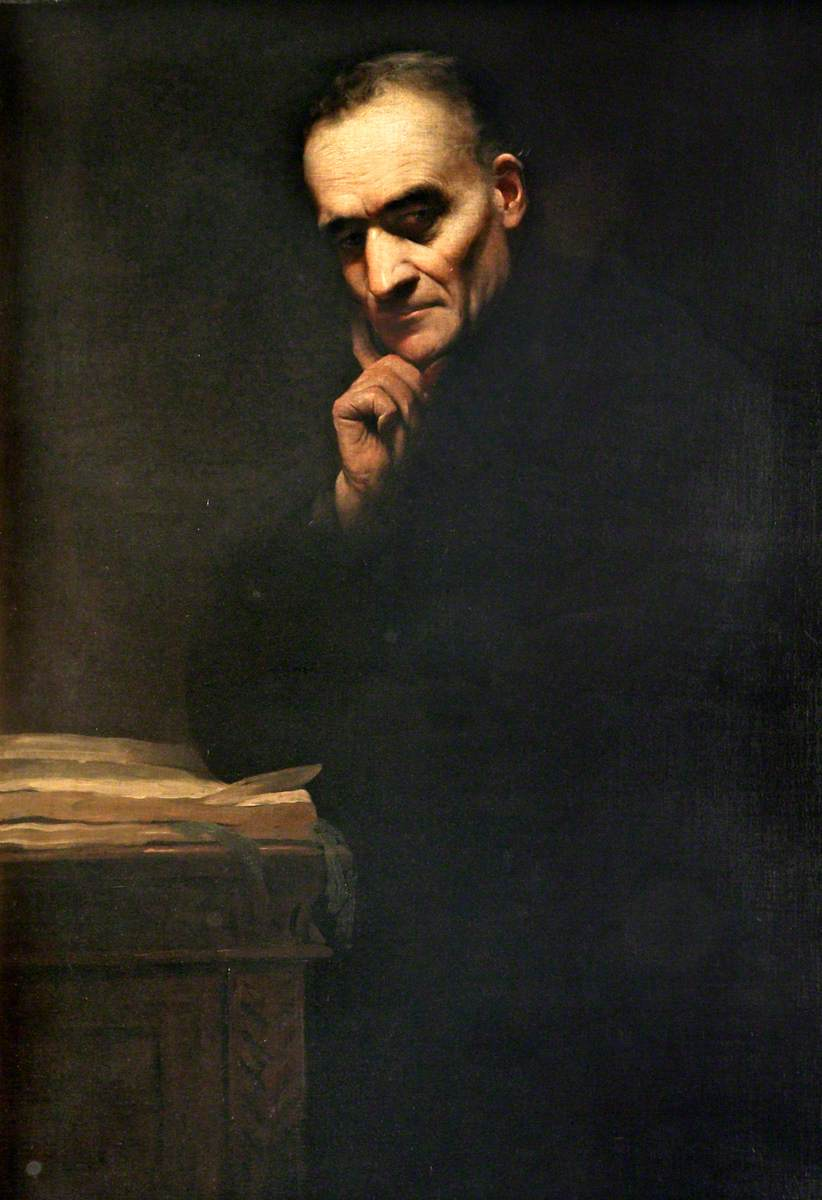
Anderledy painted by Henry Jones Thaddeus, 1886

Anton Maria Anderledy (3 June 1819 – 18 January 1892) was a Swiss Jesuit, elected the twenty-third Superior General of the Society of Jesus.

== Religious and academic formation ==
Son of a director of the postal services, Anderledy entered the Jesuit novitiate at Brig in 1838. After the novitiate, he taught for 2 years (1842–44) the classics at the college of Fribourg, where he excelled as a Latin scholar. Philosophy was done in Rome (1844–47) where he began also his theological studies. For reason of health, however he moved back to Fribourg. When the Jesuits were expelled from Switzerland (November 1847), Anderledy carried on his theological studies for a while in Chambéry (Savoy) from where another expulsion order (March 1848) drove him with fifty others to the United States. Still a student of Theology he completed the course in St. Louis, Missouri, and was finally ordained priest (29 September 1848) there, by Archbishop Peter Richard Kenrick.

== Missionary, Rector, Provincial ==
For two years (1848–50) Anderledy took care of the pastoral needs of the German migrants at Green Bay, Wisconsin, where he devoted himself with great energy to his flock. He was recalled to Europe in 1850, first in order to make his final year of formation (called 'Tertianship') in Drongen, Belgium and soon after (1851), in Germany, to be a member of the 'missionary band' led by Father Peter Roh. With him he took part in more than 40 popular missions in different German towns. In 1853, he was chosen to be rector of Jesuit students in Cologne. He accompanied them to Paderborn and remained in charge of their studies until 1859, when he was appointed Provincial of the German Province. During Anderledy's term of office, which lasted six years, he purchased the splendid medieval abbey of Maria Laach, near Bonn, where he established the province-house of higher studies. In 1865, he was himself sent to Maria-Laach as professor of moral theology. From there he launched the well-known Theological journal Stimmen aus Maria-Laach. In 1870, Anderledy was called to Rome as Assistant to the Jesuit Superior-General, for the German-speaking provinces.

== General Congregation XXIII ==
Superior General Pieter Beckx, 88 years old and infirm, had called a General Congregation in order that a vicar general (with rights of succession) be given him. Due to the great uncertainty of the political situation in Italy, General Congregation XXIII did not meet in Rome but at Fiesole (Firenze) in 1883. The electors chose with near unanimity Anton Anderledy as vicar-general (and successor to be) of Pieter Beckx. The same congregation passed also a decree that condemned 'Liberalism in the Church' and strengthened theological and scientific formation in the society. It did express also strong support for the Gregorian University.

== Vicar General, General ==
In January 1884 Anderledy assumed all the duties of the Superior-General as Beckx went into retirement in Rome. On Beckx's death in 1887, Anderledy became in title the Superior-General of the Society of Jesus.

- The few circular letters he wrote to the Society are largely on religious and spiritual themes: the canonization of Edmund Campion (and others), promotion of the devotion to the Sacred Heart, and again canonizations of Alphonsus Rodriguez, John Berchmans and Aloysius Gonzaga.
- He expressed strong support to Pope Leo XIII, first by backing strongly (in a letter of 1884) the Pope's condemnation of freemasonry in Humanum genus, and later by condemning vicious anti-papal writings that were circulating in France.
- During this time, the Jesuits were banned in many of the nations of Europe; indirectly this promoted apostolic work overseas. The Canadian mission was upgraded and made independent from England. New missions were started in Moldavia (1885), Pune (India, 1886), El Minya (Egypt, 1887). Several Theologates and Universities were founded too: Enghien (French Jesuits in exile in Belgium, 1887), Los Gatos (California), Kurseong (India, 1888), Tananarive (Malagasy, 1888), etc.
- He edited and published a new edition of Reuter's Neo-Confessarius, which he annotated.

== Appreciation ==
- Anderledy's term is characterized by its brevity, coming as it does after his immediate predecessors' long terms of office. He also had to govern the Society while exiled from Rome: his headquarters ("Curia Generalizia") was at Fiesole (Firenze). This was a source of many inconveniences.
- In his handling of the Jesuits he was known for great firmness of character. He also showed a modern interest in scientific studies in Jesuit schools.
- In spite of very difficult circumstances [at one point all the Jesuit schools in France and Italy were confiscated and their staff sent into exile] the number of members of the Society continued to increase: from 11,481, when he was elected, to 13,275 in 1892.

Catholic Church titles
Preceded by Pieter Beckx	Superior General of the Society of Jesus; 1887–1892	Succeeded by Luis Martín
