= Jan Roothaan =

Superior General of the Society of Christ

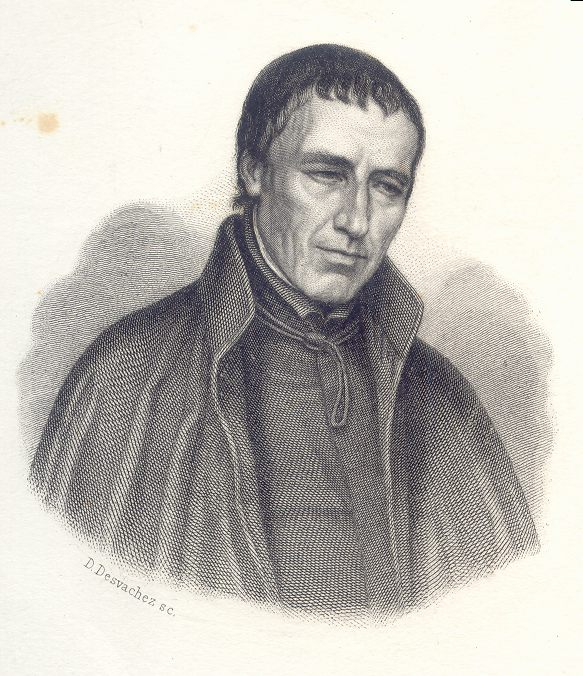
Roothaan

Jan Philipp Roothaan, SJ (23 November 1785 – 8 May 1853) was a Dutch Jesuit, elected twenty-first Superior-General of the Society of Jesus. Roothaan was a decisive figure in the reestablishment of the order after the Suppression of the Society of Jesus.

== Early life and formation ==
He was born to a once-Calvinist family emigrated from Frankfurt to Amsterdam, where they became Catholic. When Jan Philipp, the youngest of three brothers, was sixteen he graduated from the gymnasium of his native town. From there he passed to the Athenaeum Illustre (high school), and continued his classical studies for four years under Professor David Jacob van Lennep. As an altarboy at de Krijtberg church of Amsterdam the young Roothaan came in touch with ex-Jesuits priests who sent him to Russia when he expressed the desire to become a Jesuit. In 1804 he left his homeland to join the Society of Jesus whose survival in Russia had been recently approved by Pope Pius VII (1801). On the conclusion of his novitiate in Dunaburg, Latvia, he was appointed teacher at the Jesuit gymnasium at Dunaburg from 1806 to 1809. He had already mastered Polish; and he also spoke French, while the classical Latin, Greek, and Hebrew were also familiar to him. He subsequently studied philosophy and theology at the Jesuit College in Polotsk, and in 1812 was ordained priest.

== Career ==
The following four years (1812–16) were spent as professor of rhetoric at Pusza; this was the stormy era of the Napoleonic Wars, the same time period that saw Pius VII restore universally the Society of Jesus (1814). The next four years, 1816 to 1820, Roothaan worked partly as teacher and partly in pastoral duties at Orsha in White Russia (modern Belarus). However he had hardly made his final religious profession in the Society (1819) that he was sent into exile by the banishment of the Jesuits from Russia (1820). The exile road ended in Brig, Switzerland. There again he taught rhetoric for three years. Roothaan was subsequently appointed to the rectorship of the newly founded college at Turin and soon after, in 1829, vice-provincial of Italy.

== General Congregation XXI (1829) ==
At the death of Luigi Fortis, the 21st General Congregation was convoked, which, on the 9 July 1829 (at the 4th ballot), elected Jan Philipp Roothaan as Superior General. The mandate given by the Congregation to Roothaan was to strengthen and stabilize the fledgling 'new' Society: going slow on opening new schools, improving the intellectual and spiritual formation of the Jesuits, reintroducing practices of the past (Annual letters, Congregations of procurators every three years, etc.), keeping the Latin language for official communications, being strict with regard to admission to final profession, etc.

== Superior General ==
Roothaan is credited with preserving and strengthening the internal spirit of the Society. To this object he devoted nine of his eleven circular letters, starting with the first, soon after entering office. It was a sort of programme De amore Societatis et Instituti nostri (1830). To achieve this he also worked on the new edition of the Spiritual Exercises of St. Ignatius, providing it with an introduction and explanatory notes.

In 1832 he published the new Ratio Studiorum (Order of Studies) after a commission met in Rome in 1830-31. But times were not ripe for a pedagogical reform. The text was a reassertion of the benefits of traditional Jesuit education. New trends and liberal ideas were suspect.

Roothaan increased the breadth of apostolic activities, and in a vibrant letter (De missionum exterarum desiderio, 1833) he called for volunteers for the foreign missions. At the end of his term (1853) Jesuits in overseas missions (America, Africa, Asia) were 1014.

Traditional apostolic works also received his support, such as preaching, the rural missions. When an epidemic of cholera hit Rome in 1837 he sent the Jesuits to organise relief among the sick. In 1838, he unsuccessfully intervened in the 1838 Jesuit slave sale at Georgetown University in the United States, saying that “It would be better to suffer financial disaster than suffer the loss of our souls with the sale of the slaves."

Intellectual work was restarted: the Bollandists and historical research. The La Civiltà Cattolica was started. And with intellectual work, Jesuits renewed with controversies as well, as with the Italian philosopher Antonio Rosmini.

== On the road ==
Those were troubled times. Jesuits often suffered banishment from a country or another, especially in the Revolutions of 1848. Roothaan was sending them letters of encouragement in the face of tribulations. Roothaan himself had to flee Rome for two years, at the time of the Roman Republic. This gave him the opportunity to visit Jesuit communities and works in France, Belgium, Netherlands, England, Ireland; he was the first Superior General to ever do it. However, on his return, his health was broken, his strength began to fail, and fits of weakness announced his approaching end.

== Evaluation ==
After 21 years at the helm of the Society Roothaan died on the 8 May 1853, in Rome. During these years the number of Jesuits increased from 2137 to 5209 and high schools passed from 55 to 100. A highly talented man and very able administrator Roothaan displayed also an indefatigable zeal for the restoration and spiritual uplift of the Society. He was also a churchman of his time, that is not really open to the socio-political ideas that were shaping Europe in the middle of the 19th century.

Roothaan's biographer summed up his spirit well: Impetuous by nature, he governed all passions by the exercise of Christian self-denial, so that a most measured moderation in all things forms his distinctive characteristic.

== Notes ==
Catholic Church titles
Preceded by Luigi Fortis	Superior General of the Society of Jesus; 1829 – 1853	Succeeded by Pieter Beckx
