= Gruber Mansion =

Building in Ljubljana, the capital of Slovenia

Coordinates: 46°2′44.36″N 14°30′24.41″E

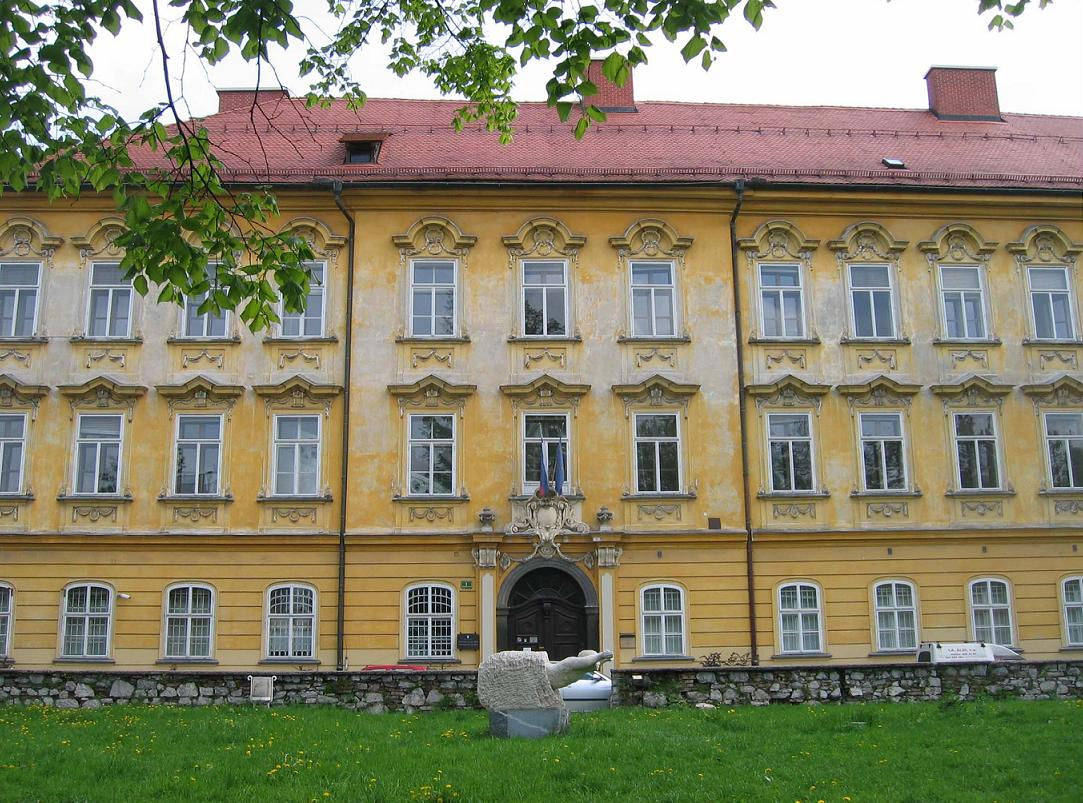
Gruber Mansion in Ljubljana

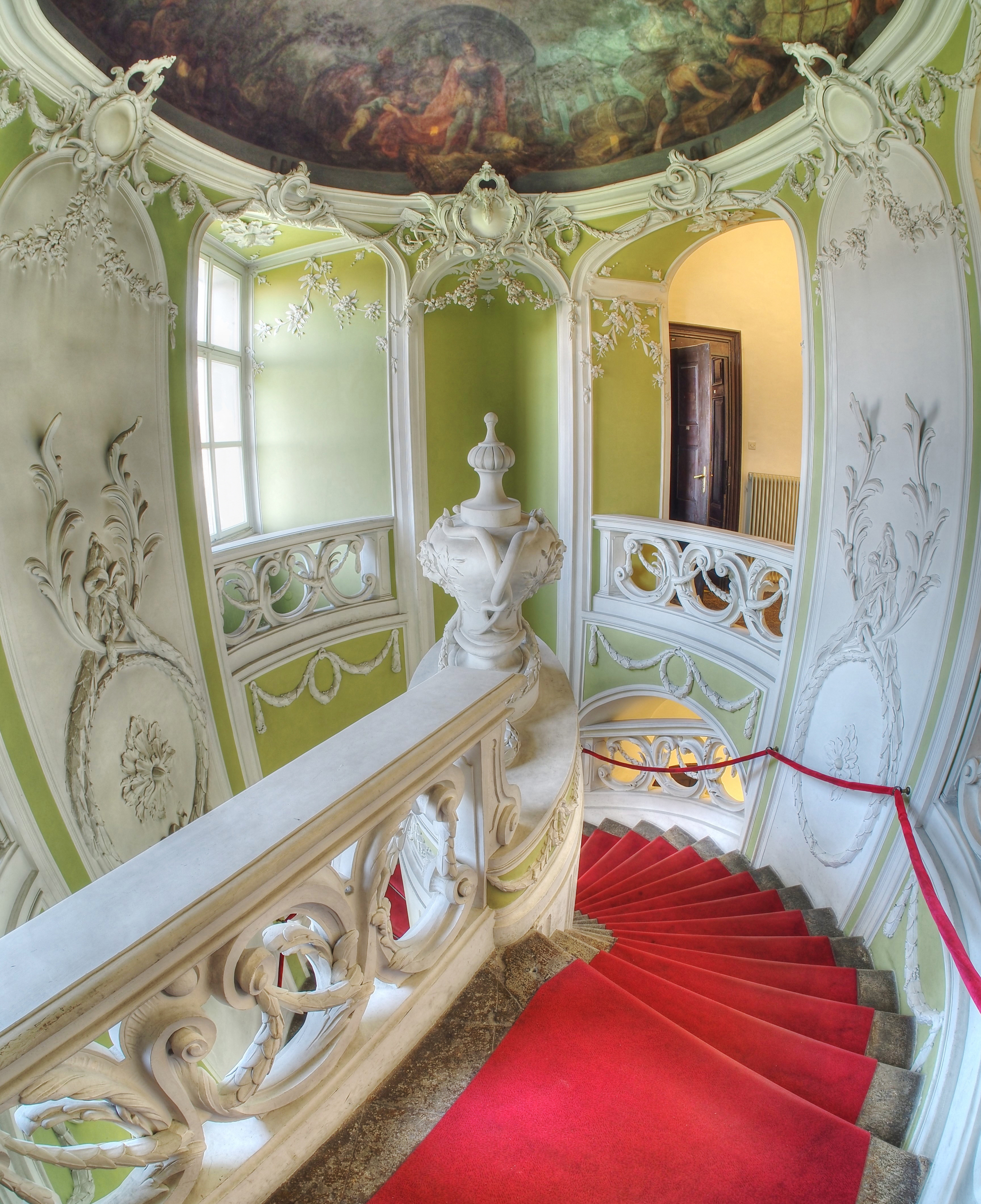
The Rococo staircase in Gruber Mansion

Gruber Mansion (Slovene: Gruberjeva palača) is a mansion in Ljubljana, the capital of Slovenia, standing at 1 Astronomy Street (Zvezdarska ulica) on the right bank of the Ljubljanica, east of Levstik Square (Levstikov trg) and Castle Hill. It currently houses the Archives of the Republic of Slovenia.

== History ==
The mansion was built between 1773 and 1777 in a braided Baroque and Rococo style by the Jesuit Viennese hydrology expert and architect Gabriel Gruber, who was also known for the construction of the Gruberjev kanal drainage channel. Gruber used the mansion as a physics and hydraulics research institute, a testament that being the construction of an observatory as a portion of the institution.

In 1840, the mansion was purchased by Anton Virant, who merged the property with his own adjacent and used it as a guest accommodation and cafe named "Zur Sternwarte" (meaning observatory). In 1887, it was bought by the Carniolan Savings Bank and in 1965, become the National Archive of Slovenia, undergoing renewal in 1990.

== Architecture ==
The mansion was designed in the late Baroque and Rococo style by highly skilled stucco artisans who commissioned to decorate its façade and interior. It is noted for its oval staircase in cool pastel colors of the era and braided and is topped with a domed ceiling designed allegorically, it is a fresco of trade, crafts and technology, completed in 1786 by Andrej Herrlein, two years after Gruber himself had been forced to leave.

On the first floor of the mansion is a chapel adorned with paintings depicting the life of the Virgin Mary which were painted by the Austrian painter Martin Johann Schmidt, also known as Kremser Schmidt. The facade of the mansion is ornamented with the portrait of Gabriel Gruber, created by the sculptor Janez Pirnat.
