= Peter Jan Beckx =

Belgian Jesuit priest (1795–1887)

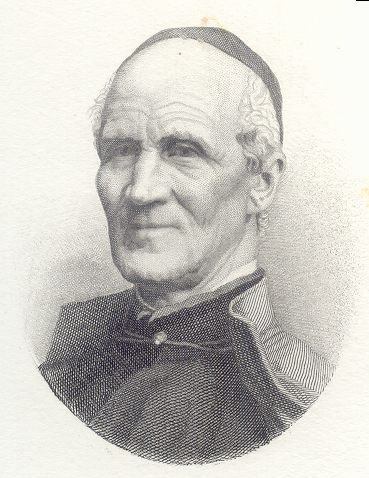
Very Rev. Peter Beckx, S.J.

Peter Jan Beckx, SJ (also Pieter Jan Beckx, in French Pierre Jean Beckx; 8 February 1795 – 4 March 1887) was a Belgian Jesuit priest, elected the twenty-second Superior-General of the Society of Jesus in 1853.

== Early life and education ==
Beckx was born in Zichem, Belgium, two months after the death of his father, in a very poor family. Another brother and sister died before he was one year old. With the help of benefactors he did his schooling in Testelt and then the municipal school of Aarschot. In 1815, he entered the Major Seminary, Mechelen in order to follow the course of studies leading to the priesthood. Ordained priest in Mechelen (6 March 1819) he was appointed in Uccle, a parish in the neighbourhood of Brussels (now part of the city). Eight months later, he resigned and entered the Society of Jesus at Hildesheim, Hanover. After the usual novitiate formation time, he completed his Theological and Biblical studies (1823–26) in Germany. He was soon able to preach, hear confessions, and give retreats in the German language.

== Career ==
The Duke and Duchess of Anhalt-Köthen converted to Catholicism in 1825 and asked for a Jesuit chaplain. Beckx was appointed to this duty, and went to live in Köthen. By giving classes to children in his own house, building a little church and organizing spiritual activities he brought many people back to the Catholic faith. After the death of the Duke of Anhalt-Köthen (in 1830), Beckx went to live in Vienna, where he was the only Jesuit for many years. His powerful sermons gave him fame and Jan Roothaan, the Superior General, often asked him to negotiate on his behalf the foundation of Jesuit schools: Graz, Innsbruck, and Linz. From time to time he was called to Rome and sent on missions to Lombardy, Hungary, and Bavaria. After teaching for a few years Canon Law at the Roman College in Rome (1842) he was sent to Belgium (1848) and was appointed Rector of the Jesuit theologate in Leuven (in 1850). But his services were required in Vienna, where the situation for the Jesuits was difficult. In 1852 Roothaan sent him again to Vienna, as provincial, and his chief negotiator.

=== General Congregation XXII ===
As Provincial of Austria, Beckx attended the General Congregation of June 1853, called to elect a successor to Jan Roothaan who had died in March. On 2 July, at the first ballot, Peter Jan Beckx was elected (27 votes out of 51) Superior General of the Society of Jesus. Four Assistants were also elected. The Congregation also expressed concern at the renewed attacks made against the Jesuits, and advised prudence and tact in defending the Society against its detractors.

=== Superior General ===
The suppression of the Society made for difficult years for the Jesuits. They were expelled from Russia in 1820, Spain (in 1854 and 1858), from Naples-Sicily (1859), from Germany (1872), from France and French colonies (1880), and even from Rome itself, in 1873, during which time Beckx shifted his headquarters to Fiesole, near Florence, where the 'Curia Generalizia' remained until 1895.

Beckx wrote a good 15 letters to his Jesuit companions, helping them keeping the spirit alive in the face of often vicious attacks. They are striking by their serenity and openness, in spite of the calamities they were facing, especially the letter of 1871 written to the whole Society after several French Jesuits (among whom was Pierre Olivaint) were executed during the Paris Commune of 1870. Considering the 'changing times' he was quite open to new apostolic activities. He modernized the Ratio Studiorum, giving more room to science subjects in Jesuit education and encouraging the discussion of modern philosophers such as Immanuel Kant. While "religious freedom" could be promoted (with prudence...), questioning the temporal power of the Church was taboo.

In September 1871, Beckx consecrated the Society to the Heart of Jesus: love for, and spiritual union with, the person of Jesus is central to Jesuit life and activities.

New missions were begun in different parts of the world, promoted indirectly too by a growing oversee emigration of people from Europe: Cuba (1853), Colombia (1858), Philippines (1859), Madagascar (1861), Mangalore in India (1878), Armenia (1881), Australia (1882), etc. Intellectual work was encouraged too. Several journals were started: La Civiltà Cattolica (Italy, 1850), The Month (London, 1864), Etudes (Paris, 1865), Stimmen aus Maria Laach (Germany, 1865) and others in Ireland, Poland and Belgium.

During his generalship Ultramontanism largely prevailed upon the Liberal wing of Catholicism. The journal La Civiltà Cattolica, very close to the Holy See (certain articles, it was said, were directly inspired by Pope Pius IX) was particularly engaged in the struggle: defense of the Papal States (from 1859), defense of the Syllabus of Errors (1864), defense of the supremacy of the Pope (1870).

During the thirty years that Beckx led the Jesuits, their membership doubled and a large number of new provinces were established in Ireland, France, Spain, Portugal, Missouri (USA), etc. His tenure was marked by an increased focus on missions in Protestant countries.

=== Election of a Vicar General ===
By 1883, he was 88 years old, having spent 30 years in various offices. Infirm, on his own accord he called a General Congregation in order that a 'Vicar General with rights of succession' be chosen to serve under him. General Congregation XXIII met in 1883, in Rome, and on 24 September Anton Anderledy, a Swiss Jesuit priest, was elected. Beckx, though remaining in title the 'Superior General' in effect abdicated his charge entirely. He died in Rome four years later, aged 92.

== Writings ==
- Der Monat Maria (Month of Mary), Vienna, 1843.
- Epistolae selectae, Roma.

== Sources ==
- CHANDLERY, P., Memoirs of San Girolamo, Fiesole (1873–93), Roehampton, 1901.
- SCHOETERS, G., P.-J. Beckx en de 'Jesuïeten-politiek' van zijn tijd, Antwerpen, 1975.
- VERSTRAETEN, A., Leven van den hoogw. P.P. Beckx, Antwerpen, 1889.
- Chisholm, Hugh, ed. (1911). "Beckx, Pierre Jean" . Encyclopædia Britannica. Vol. 3 (11th ed.). Cambridge University Press.
- Kelly, Patrick Henry (1907). "Pierre-Jean Beckx" . In Herbermann, Charles (ed.). Catholic Encyclopedia. Vol. 2. New York: Robert Appleton Company.

Catholic Church titles
Preceded by Jan Roothaan	Superior General of the Society of Jesus; 1853 – 1887	Succeeded by Anton Anderledy
