= Henri Philippe de Chauvelin =

French cleric and politician

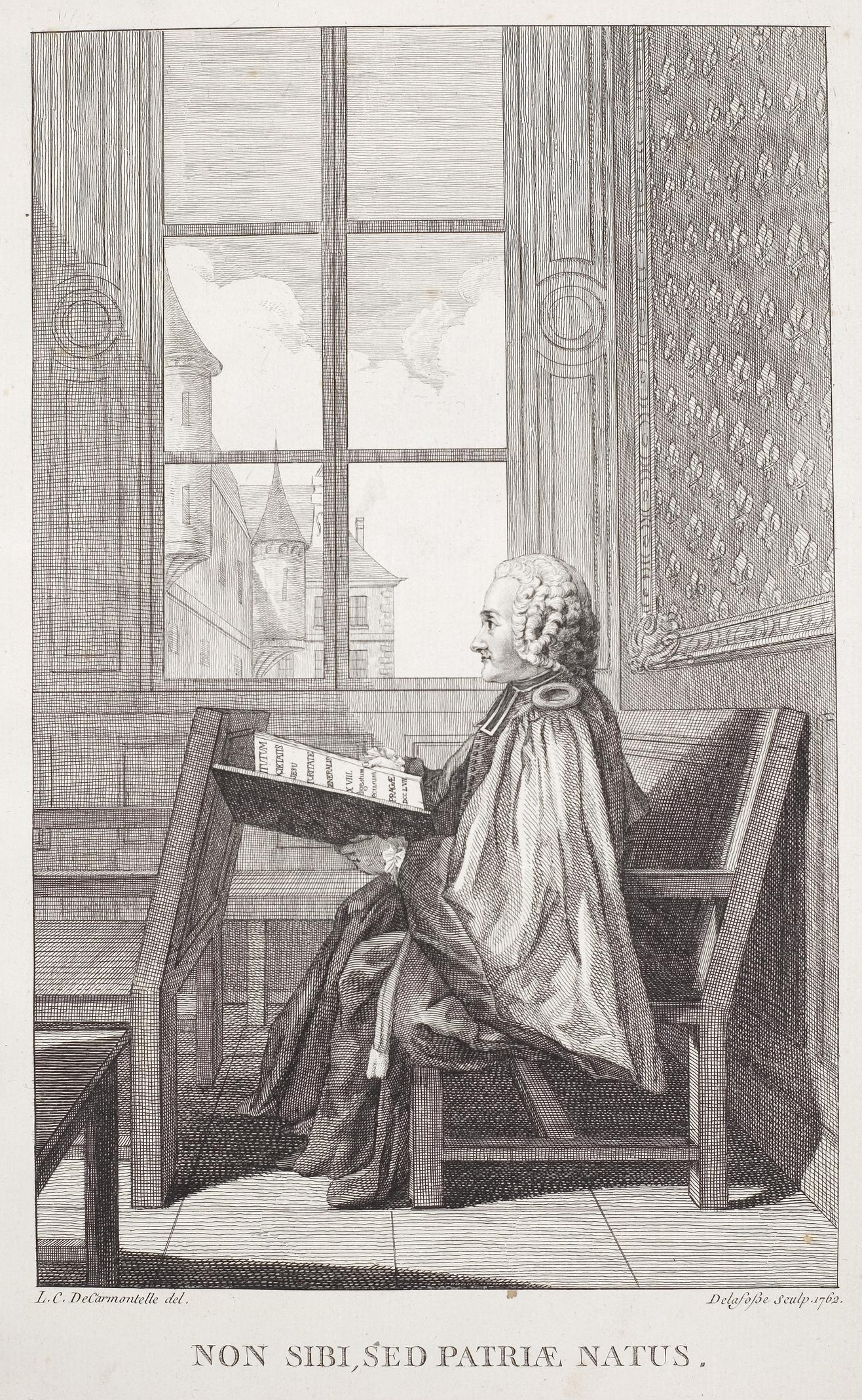
- Engraving by Jean-Baptiste Delafosse, according to the description of Louis Carrogis Carmontelle
- Born: 18 April 1714
- Died: 14 January 1770 (aged 55)
- Occupation: Canon
- Notable work: Compte rendu sur la doctrine des Jésuites Discours sur les constitutions des Jésuites

Henri Philippe de Chauvelin (1714–1770) was a French cleric and politician. He was a canon of Notre Dame de Paris and a councillor to the parlement de Paris. Known as the Abbé de Chauvelin, he was the youngest son of Germain Louis Chauvelin and thus a brother of marquis François Claude Chauvelin.

He ardently attacked the Society of Jesus and defended Jansenism, leading to his imprisonment on mont Saint-Michel in 1763. When he was released, he continued to struggle against the Jesuits and in 1761 published two works which had a major impact -Discours sur les constitutions des Jésuites and Compte rendu sur la doctrine des Jésuites. This allowed him to get the Parlement of Paris to banish the Jesuits from France.
