= Gabriel Gruber =

Superior-General of the Society of Jesus

The Reverend Gabriel Gruber SJ
- Superior General for Russia
- Illustration of Gruber
- Installed: 1802
- Term ended: 7 April 1805
- Predecessor: Franciszek Kareu
- Successor: Tadeusz Brzozowski

Orders
- Ordination: 1766

Personal details
- Born: Gabriel Erhard Jan Nepomucen Gruber; 4 May 1740 Vienna, Habsburg Empire
- Died: 7 April 1805 (aged 64) Saint Petersburg, Russian Empire
- Buried: Russia
- Denomination: Roman Catholic
- Residence: Austria, Ljubljana, Polotsk, Saint Petersburg
- Education: Jesuit formation, engineering, Physics, agriculture, art
- Alma mater: Vienna, Graz, Trnava

Gabriel Gruber, SJ (4 May 1740 – 7 April 1805) was an Austrian Jesuit and polymath. Aside from his classical formation for the priesthood, his interests ranged across agriculture, architecture, astronomy, engineering, hydrology, physics, chemistry and art.

Between 1773 and 1784, Gruber was the engineer at the court of Emperor Joseph II. Having moved to Russia, where Vatican law did not apply, he was welcomed at the Court of Catherine the Great as an engineer and saw there an opportunity to resume his ministerial career among his exiled Jesuit brethren. He became the second Superior General of the Society of Jesus in Russia during the Holy See's suppression of the Society in Europe and its colonies and manifested great political skill in safeguarding the survival of the Jesuit order.

== Early years and education ==
Gabriel Gruber was born on 4 May 1740 in Vienna to a Slovenian family. His father was an armourer by trade. In 1755 he entered the Society of Jesus, aged 15. His three younger brothers, Anton, Johann-Nepomuk and Tobias, also followed him into the Jesuits.

His initial formation and studies took place in Austria, including Latin and Greek in Leoben (1757–1758), theology, philosophy and mathematics in Graz (1758–60), languages in Vienna (1760–61), mathematics at Trnava Jesuit university then in Hungary (1761–62), and again theology in Vienna (1763–67). In addition he undertook special studies in drawing, painting, music, mathematics, physics and medicine (specialising in surgery). During 1761-62 and 1762-63 he took up courses in astronomy and in civilian and military architecture.

1766, he was ordained priest in Graz. During 1767-1768 while in Judenburg he completed his tertianship.

== The engineer ==
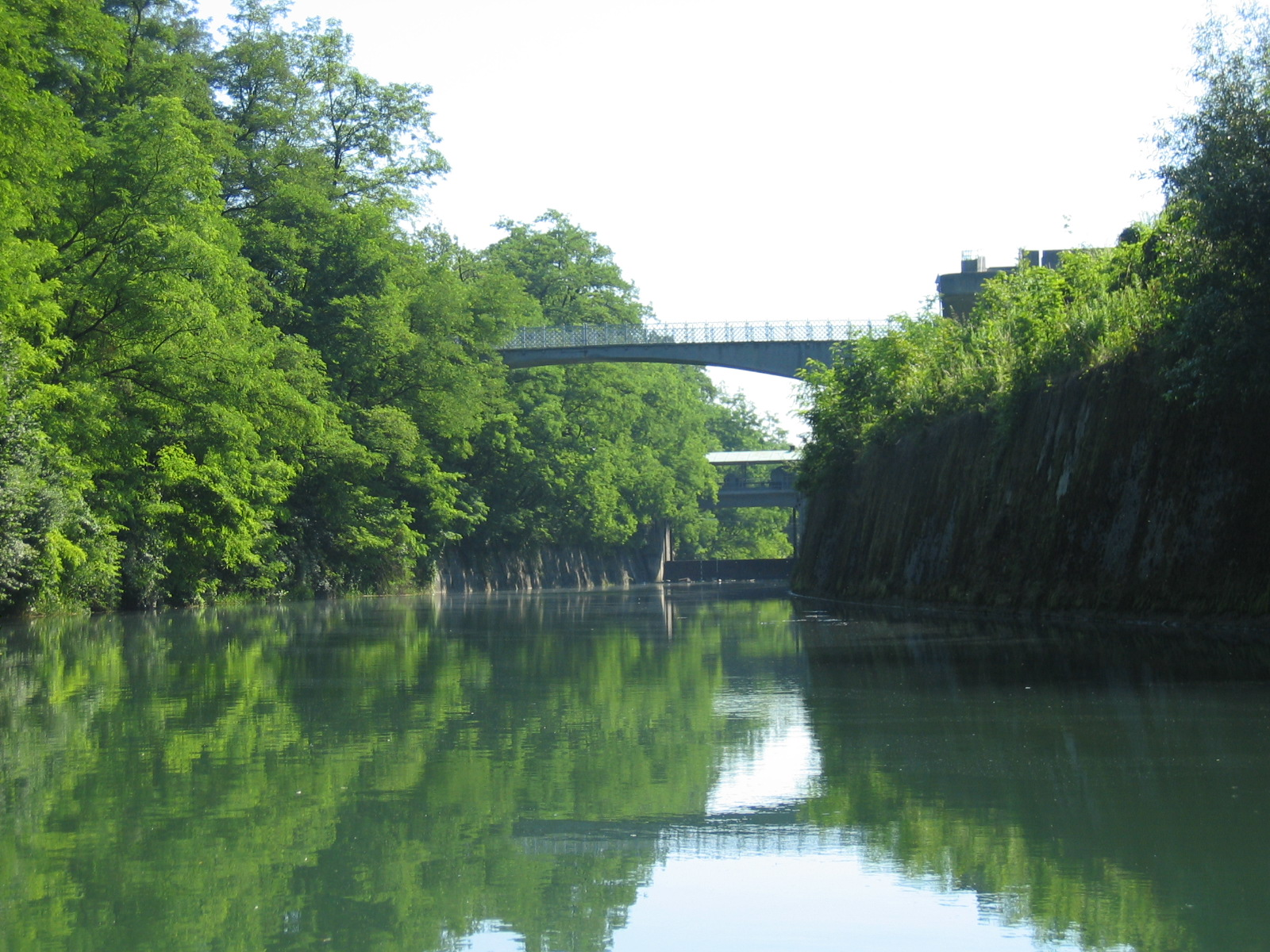
The Gruber Canal

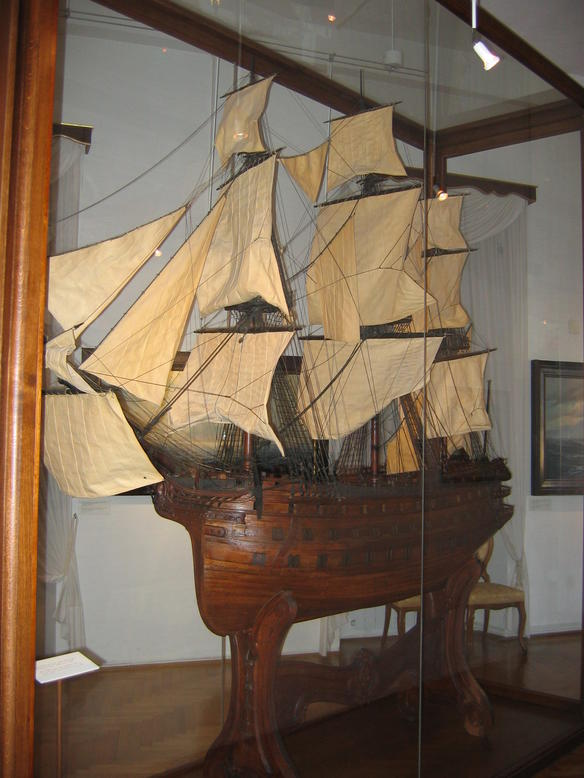
Kaiser Karl der Sechste, Gruber's battleship model, the Maritime Museum, Piran

In 1768, he moved to Ljubljana, where from 1769 he taught mathematics, mechanics, hydraulics and engineering at the School of Mechanical Engineering. The school taught courses in shipbuilding, port devices and structures, and it was Gruber's wish to build a dockyard nearby. That enterprise proved to be prohibitively expensive. In time Gruber became an expert in hydrotechnology and architecture, and had also a basic knowledge of navigation and the history of seamanship.

Early in life, Gruber had been a fanatical builder of model ships. Some of the teaching materials at the School of Mechanical Engineering were naval models of his that were made at the school between 1774 and 1783, including a framework used during ship construction.

Between 1772 and 1780, the construction of the Gruber Canal proceeded to his plans, in order to improve the outflow of water from the Ljubljana Marsh and thus to protect the city of Ljubljana from flooding. The works were carried out under his supervision until 1777, when he was replaced by Vincenzo Struppi, due to large increases in expenses and even doubts about his integrity. At the same time, he was the architect and builder of the Gruber Palace — a vast rococo edifice which was originally his mansion — used for his research in physics and hydraulics. It also had an astronomical observatory. In 1887 the palace was bought by the Carniolan Savings Bank and since 1965 it has housed the Slovenian archives.

=== Overtaken by Church events ===
From 1772 until 1781 Gruber was the director of the navigation department in Ljubljana, which took custody of the improvement of navigation on the Sava, the Kolpa and the Ljubljanica rivers. After the Suppression of the Society of Jesus by Pope Clement XIV, in 1773, Gruber remained as engineer at the court of Emperor Joseph II until 1784.

== Return to the Jesuits in Russia ==
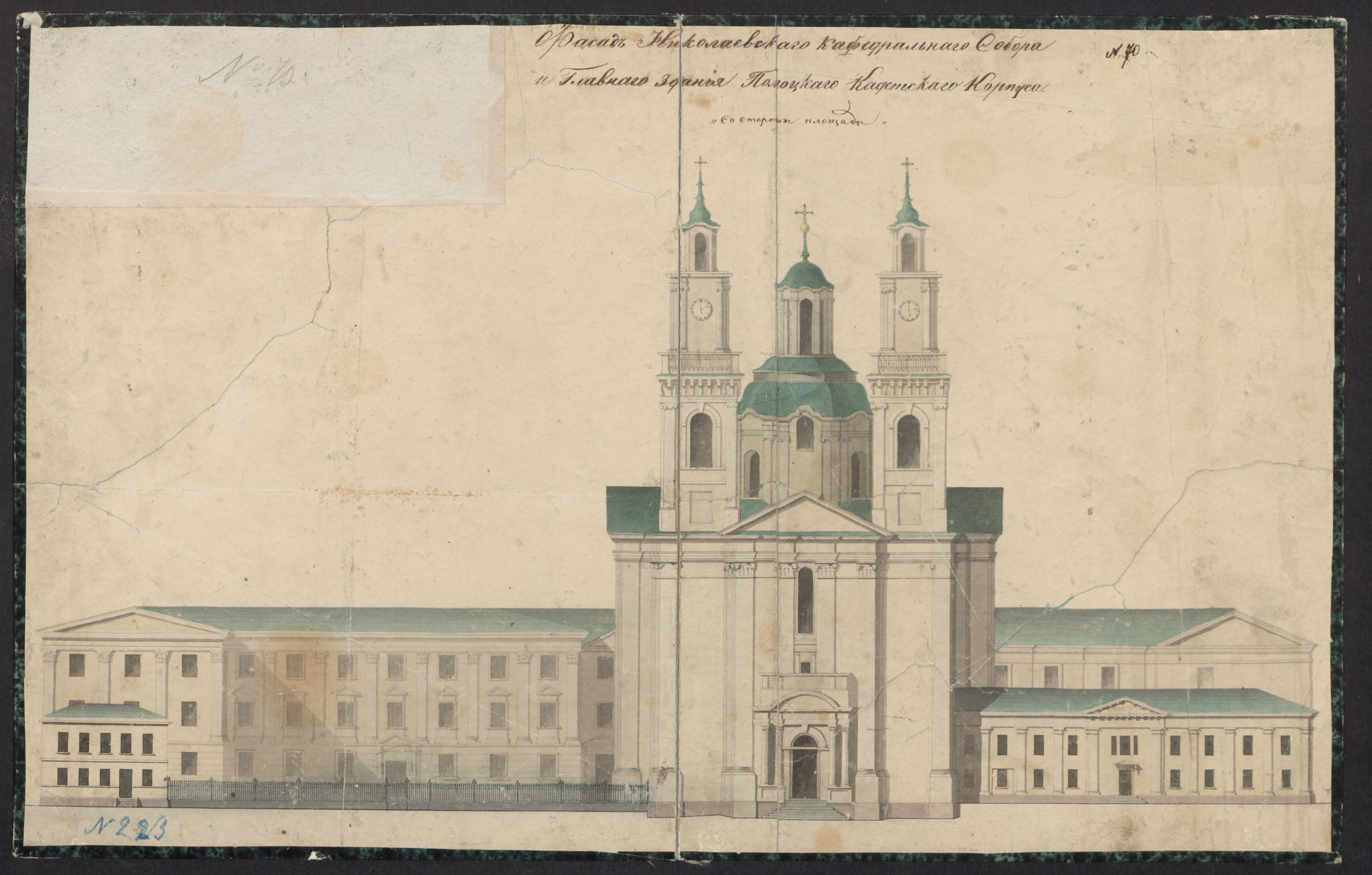
The Jesuit College in Polotsk, a famous academy of technical science

In 1785, Gruber went to Polotsk, a border city between the Polish–Lithuanian Commonwealth and the Russian Empire to rejoin the Society of Jesus and became a member of the Jesuit community in Russia. Gruber was an active engineer, chemist, architect, painter, mechanic and physicist. Under his influence, the Jesuit College in Polotsk became a famous academy of technical science. He was influential in the court of Catherine the Great, and was close to her son and successor Tsar Paul I, at whose request he reorganized the technical training in the whole Russian empire. In 1800 Gruber became the first rector of the Aristocratic College at the Saint Petersburg State University.

== Superior General ==
Living in Saint Petersburg, and being a close confidant of Paul I of Russia, Gruber often discussed with him the affairs of his Society, on behalf of Franciszek Kareu, Vicar General of the Jesuits in Russia. In 1797 he officially became the Assistant of Kareu and ultimately, after the death of the later, Gruber was elected Superior General of the Society of Jesus in Russia, at the Regional (Polotsk) Congregation IV of 1802. That was just a few months after Pius VII had issued the brief Catholicae fidei (1801), giving approval to the existence of the Russian Jesuits and making the Temporary Vicar (Franciszek Kareu) 'Superior General for Russia'. Gruber expanded pioneering activities by opening several missions among the Germans in the Volga region (Saratov, 1803), Odessa (1804) and Astrakhan (1805) where schools and agricultural activities were developed. However, politically, problems were growing with Paul I as well as with the local bishop of Polotsk.

== Towards reinstatement ==
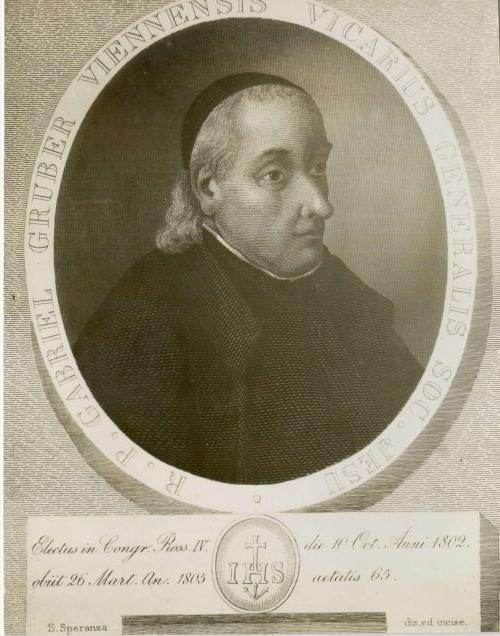
Gabriel Gruber at the end of his life

In the meantime the movement towards reinstatement of the Jesuits was gaining momentum. In the wake of the French revolution the political opposition of the Bourbon courts had weakened against the Jesuits. In 1803 the formerly exiled English Jesuits in Europe led by Marmaduke Stone SJ, settled at the Stonyhurst estate, England, donated by philanthropist, Thomas Weld, and became members of the Russian Jesuit province. The 'Fathers of the Faith' an independent group of ex-jesuits received affiliation in 1805. Contacts were established with the ex-Jesuits of Maryland (USA). In 1804, the existence of the Jesuits was officially recognized in Naples and Gruber became 'Superior General of the Society of Jesus in Russia and Naples'. Plans were afoot to send an overland mission to China when Gruber died from smoke inhalation from an accidental fire at his Saint Petersburg residence on April 7, 1805.

== See also ==
- Gruber Mansion
- Jurij Vega
- List of Jesuits
- Superior General of the Society of Jesus

Catholic Church titles
Preceded by Franciszek Kareu	Superior General of the Society of Jesus In Exile (Russia); 1802–1805	Succeeded by Tadeusz Brzozowski
