= Franciszek Kareu =

Temporary Vicar General of the Society of Jesus (1731–1802)

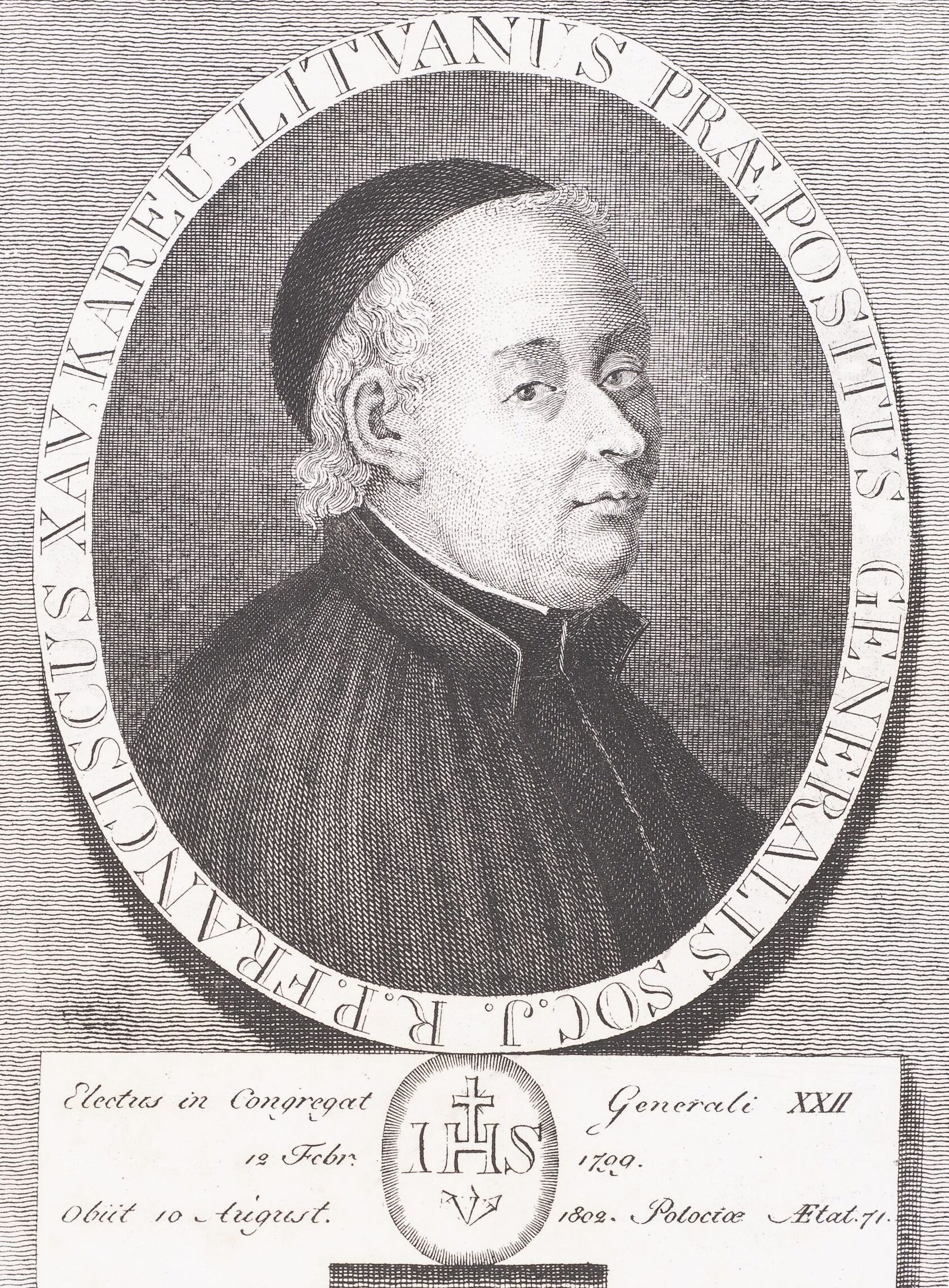
Franciszek Kareu (1731–1802)

Franciszek Kareu, SJ (10 December 1731, Orsza – 11 August 1802, Polotsk) was a Polish-Welsh Jesuit priest, architect, missionary and teacher in the region of modern-day Belarus. During the worldwide suppression of the Society of Jesus, with the exception of the territory of the Russian Empire, he was elected temporary vicar general of the Society of Jesus in Russia from 1799 to 1801. His careful management of this precarious institutional challenge facilitated a transition leading to the universal restoration of the order in the early 19th-century.

== Early years and formation ==
Born of a noble Welsh family (Carew), settled in the Grand Duchy of Lithuania, he followed the conventional course of studies available to sons of the landowning class. These included humanities and philosophy, in Orsza (in present-day Belarus), before joining the Jesuit order. As all candidates of the time, Kareu joined the Jesuits in Vilnius, where he completed two years of novitiate (1754–56). There followed a spell of teaching at Kražiai College (1756–58) and theological studies in Pinsk (1759–63), where he was ordained priest in 1762.

== Career ==
Against the background of tumultuous political events, the Partitions of Poland in three stages between 1772 and 1795, Catholic Church life continued. After missionary work in Minsk, Nieswiez, and Slutsk, Kareu arrived in Polotsk in 1768 where he studied architecture under the guidance of the Jesuit architect, Gabriel Lenkiewicz, along with teaching philosophy and mathematics at the Jesuit College in Polotsk (1769–72). Being close to Stanislaus Czerniewicz and Lenkiewicz, he helped them in their efforts to keep the Society of Jesus going in expanding Russia. He was made Rector of the High School of Orsza in 1782 and took part in the Regional Congregations of 1782 and 1785 which elected successively Cerniewicz and Lenkiewicz, Temporary Vicars General in Russia. After 1785, Kareu was made Rector of what had been the most prestigious Jesuit College in Polish–Lithuanian Commonwealth, Polotsk. In this period, he funded the purchase of a printing press from which, school manuals, philosophical and theological treatises and devotional books were produced.

=== Regional Congregation III ===
On 12 February 1799, in the first ballot, Kareu was elected Vicar General of the Society in Russia. He soon had to deal with the bishop of Mogilev's desire to interfere in the appointment of Provincials and Rectors of the Society. Kareu appealed to Emperor Paul I, of Russia, who reaffirmed the independence of the Society, and asked for the Jesuits to take charge of a few projects in Lithuania and in Saint Petersburg, at the Church of Saint Catharina. The emperor's suggestion of a High school in St Petersburg was also accepted, but this could not be started as Paul I was assassinated in March 1801. His successor, Emperor Alexander I was far less friendly towards the Society and finally expelled it in 1820.

=== Superior General ===
Through the establishment of the Jesuits in the Duchy of Parma in 1793, and the letter of endorsement from Emperor Paul I of Russia, the Pope, Pius VII began ecclesiastical mechanisms that eventually resulted in the universal approval of the existence of the Society in 1814. However, in 1801 strong political opposition towards the existence of the Society was launched by Charles IV of Spain which led Pope Pius VII to qualify his acceptance of the Society by limiting it to the Russian Empire. He expressed this on 7 March 1801, in the Papal brief Catholicae fidei, through which Franciszek Kareu was made 'Superior General for Russia'.

After 1801, contact with ex-Jesuits increased, thanks to the efforts of his able Assistant Gabriel Gruber, and future successor as 'Superior General for Russia'. In this period, the Rector of Stonyhurst (England) asked if the School might be allowed to affiliate itself with the Society in Russia. Negotiations also began for a union with the 'Paccanarist' priests. The Patriarch of Constantinople also asked for the Jesuits to serve in his patriarchate. During Kareu's vicariate of the Society in Russia, the universal restoration of the Society by the Catholic Church, became a distinct possibility.

== Death ==
Since the beginning of 1801, Kareu had suffered from asthma. When he realised that his health had become a liability, he appointed an assistant, the Viennese, Gabriel Gruber who was himself later elected Vicar General. Kareu died in Polotsk on 11 August 1802.

== See also ==
- List of Jesuits
- Superior General of the Society of Jesus

== Bibliography ==
- Inglot, M. "How the Jesuits survived their Suppression…", Saint Joseph's University Press, Philadelphia, 2015.
- INGLOT, M., La Compagnia di Gesù nell'Impero Russo (1772–1820), Roma, 1997.
- ZALENSKI, S., Les Jésuites de la Russie Blanche, (2 vol.), Paris, 1886.
- ROUET de JOURNEL, M.J., La Compagnie de Jésus en Russie: un collège de Jésuites à Saint Pétersbourg (1800–16), Paris, 1922.

Catholic Church titles
Preceded by Gabriel Lenkiewicz	Temporary Vicar General of the Society of Jesus; 1799 – 1801	Succeeded by approval
Preceded by suppression	Superior General of the Society of Jesus in Exile (Russia); 1801 – 1802	Succeeded by Gabriel Gruber
