= Gabriel Lenkiewicz =

Gabriel Lenkiewicz-Ipohorski, SJ (15 March 1722, Polotsk – 21 November 1798, Polotsk) was a Polish-Lithuanian Jesuit priest, and Temporary Vicar General of the Society of Jesus from 1785 until 1798, at a time when under papal suppression in all Catholic countries, the Society continued in Russia.

== Early years and formation ==
Lenkiewicz was born in Polotsk, Polish–Lithuanian Commonwealth (today's Belarus), in a noble Polish–Lithuanian family. He joined the Jesuits after completing the 'Humanities'. He did his philosophy (1748–51) in Nieswiez and then studied mathematics, astronomy and architecture at the Academy of Vilnius (1752–54). This was followed by theology in Warsaw (1754–58) where he was ordained priest (1757). After a few years teaching mathematics in Warsaw he was sent to Polish College in Rome for further specialisation in Architecture (1762–65).

== Career ==
Back in Poland he was appointed to teach science at Polotsk (1765–68) but he made himself a name rather as architect of public and ecclesiastical buildings, including the construction of new premises for the Jesuit College of Polotsk where Stanislaus Czerniewicz was the rector. After the First Partition of Poland-Lithuania and the second Suppression of the Society of Jesus (1773) he became the right hand man of Vicar General Czerniewicz, negotiating alongside him the survival of the Jesuits with Empress Catherine II of Russia, all the while making sure that the standard of scientific education in Polotsk remained high. To Lenkiewicz, 'quality education' was an absolute necessity if the Society was to survive in the Russian Empire.

=== The Second General - Interim - Congregation of Polotsk ===
Lenkiewicz was busy preparing the Second General (Interim) Congregation called to elect a successor to Stanislaw Czerniewicz (died in 1785) when news reached him that Pope Pius VI had given verbal approval (12 March 1783) for the existence of the Society in Russia. At the Second General Congregation of Polotsk, Lenkiewicz was elected Vicar General on 8 October 1785. Much encouraged by the tacit approval of the Pope, the Congregation of Fathers did much to re-organise the life of the Society in Russia, after the first years of disarray, focusing on religious life and commitment, education (implementing the Ratio Studiorum), formation, admission of ex-Jesuits, etc. The province in Russia then numbered 172 Jesuits (95 priests, 23 students, 48 brothers and 6 novices). They ran 6 high schools. Polotsk became the centre of all Jesuit activities.

=== Temporary Vicar General ===
As Vicar General Lenkiewicz established relations with ex-Jesuits who wanted to rejoin the Society. He developed missionary activities in the North, but had to struggle to maintain the Society’s independence in the face of interference from the local bishop. After the death of two strong supporters of the Society in Russia, the local Governor in 1791, and most especially after the death of Empress Catherine in 1796, Lenkiewicz went through tough times. He was heartened however, when her son and successor, Emperor Paul I, expressed support for the Jesuits, a few months after her death, in 1797. The Society's hope of being once again officially recognised was coming closer to realisation, when the Duke of Parma, Italy, asked for some Jesuits to be sent to recommence work in Parma in 1793. Many ex-Jesuits asked to be re-affiliated with the Society in Russia in this period.

The years when Lenkiewicz was Vicar General were characterised by improved stability in the life of the Jesuits in Russia, and by the renewal of apostolic activities. Young men arrived from all over Western Europe with the desire to join the Jesuits. Spending 30 years in Polotsk in various capacities Lenkiewicz made it a renowned place, with its scientific laboratory, rich library, museum of natural sciences, and other artistic and religious resources. He died in office in Polotsk.

== Bibliography ==
- Marek Inglot: La Compagnia di Gesù nell'Imperio Russo (1772-1820), Roma, 1997.
- S. Zalenski: Les Jésuites de la Russie Blanche, (2 vol.), Paris, 1886.

== Succession ==
Catholic Church titles
Preceded by Stanislaus Czerniewicz	Temporary Vicar General of the Society of Jesus; 1785 – 1798	Succeeded by Franciszek Kareu
