= Peter Roh =

Swiss Jesuit preacher (1811–1872)

Peter Roh (14 August 1811 – 17 May 1872) was a Swiss Jesuit preacher.

== Life ==
Up to his thirteenth year, Roh spoke only French, so that he had to learn German from a German priest in the vicinity before he was able to begin his gymnasial studies in the boarding-school kept by the Jesuits at Brig in Switzerland. He later became a day-pupil at the gymnasium kept by the Jesuits at Sitten. While there, he resolved to enter the Society of Jesus (1829); strange to say the external means of bringing him to this decision was the reading of Pascal's pamphlet Monita Secreta.

He taught the lower gymnasial classes at the lyceum at Fribourg. He was the first (1842-45) professor of dogmatics at Fribourg, then at the academy at Lucerne, which had just been given to the Jesuits. At the same time, Roh preached and aided as opportunity occurred in missions. These labors were interrupted by the breaking out of the Swiss Sonderbund War, during which he was military chaplain; but after its end he was obliged to flee into Piedmont, from there to Linz and to Gries. Finally, he found a safe refuge at Ribeauvillé in Alsace as tutor in the family of his countryman and friend Siegwart-Müller, also expatriated. He stayed there until 1849.

Roh's professorship of dogmatics at the Catholic University of Leuven only lasted a year. When the Catholic missions for the common people were opened in Germany in 1850, his real labors began; as he said himself, "Praise God, I now come into my element."

He was an extemporaneous speaker; the writing of sermons and addresses was, as he himself confessed, "simply impossible" to him.

== Works ==
He could also write when necessary, as several articles from him in the "Stimmen aus Maria-Laach" prove. In his pamphlet "Das alte Lied: der Zweck heiligt die Mittel, im Texte verbessert und auf neue Melodie gesetzt", he declared he would give a thousand florins to the person who could show to the faculty of law of Bonn or Heidelberg a book written by a Jesuit which taught the principle that the end justifies the means. The prize went unclaimed.

Some of his sermons have also been preserved; they were printed against his will from stenographic notes. Father Roh's greatest strength lay in his power of speech and "he was the most powerful and effective preacher of the German tongue that the Jesuits have had in this century".
