= Expulsion of congregations =

Expulsion of congregations may refer to:

- Expulsion of congregations (1880)
- Expulsion of congregations (1902–1903)

== See also ==
- Suppression of monasteries
- Secularization (church property)
