= Stanislaus Czerniewicz =

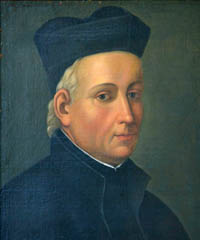
Rev. Stanislaus Czerniewicz, S.J.

Stanislaw Czerniewicz, SJ (15 August 1728 in Kaunas – 7 July 1785) was a Lithuanian-Polish Jesuit priest. He was Rector of the Jesuit College in Polotsk when the Society of Jesus was suppressed in 1773; in 1782, he was elected vicar general for the Jesuits in Russia in 1782 and de facto Superior General of the Society of Jesus.

== Early career ==
After his Jesuit training in Lithuania – philosophy (1747–50) and theology (1753–57) at Academy of Vilnius – Czerniewicz taught grammar and poetry in the Kražiai College (1750–53) before being called to Rome where he was secretary for the Polish Assistancy of the Society of Jesus (1759–68). There he got familiarised with the governance of the society. He returned to his country where he was made rector of the Jesuit College in Polotsk (now in Belarus) in 1770.

== After the suppression of the Society of Jesus ==
The brief of Clement XIV suppressing the Society (July 1773) could not be promulgated in the Jesuit houses of the Russian Empire, as the Czarina Catherina the II of Russia, a non-Catholic, strictly forbade it. She has no wish to see the Jesuits leaving their schools. There were at the time 201 Jesuits in the Russian Empire and they carried on their work as before. As rector of the largest community and school, Czerniewicz was a "reference of authority" in the group. Perplexed as to how to proceed, he sought in 1775, through indirect contacts, approval from Clement XIV's successor of on the papal throne, Pius VI. He rather cryptically, gave Czerniewicz to understand that he was not displeased with the situation. Czerniewicz then began receiving Jesuits from other countries in Europe (1776) and soon also received permission (1779) to open a novitiate for new recruits in Polotsk.

== Regional (Polish) Congregation I ==
As this was rather unofficial and he had no legal authority over the Jesuits, Czerniewicz requested the local bishop (in charge of religious affairs) and Catherine II permission to call a Regional Congregation to elect a vicar general of the society. This was granted. The Congregation met in 1782. On 17 October, Czerniewicz was elected vicar general with the full authority of a superior general. The opening of the novitiate and then the election of a vicar general created a diplomatic crisis between Russia and the Bourbon's courts in Europe, but Catherine defended "her Jesuits" with the silent approval of Pius VI.

== The vicar general ==
Faithful to the Constitutions of Saint Ignatius, Czerniewicz quietly prepared the rebirth of the society, conducting a correspondence with many ex-Jesuits in a number of European countries and keeping them informed of Russian developments. His understanding of Russian mentality helped him also, as did the Society to find the right course through very difficult times. He died on 7 July 1785.

Catholic Church titles
| Preceded by pre-suppression (position last held de jure by Lorenzo Ricci) | Temporary Vicar General of the Society of Jesus; 1782 – 1785 | Succeeded by Gabriel Lenkiewicz |
