= Suppression of the Society of Jesus =

Persecution of Jesuits from 1759 to 1814

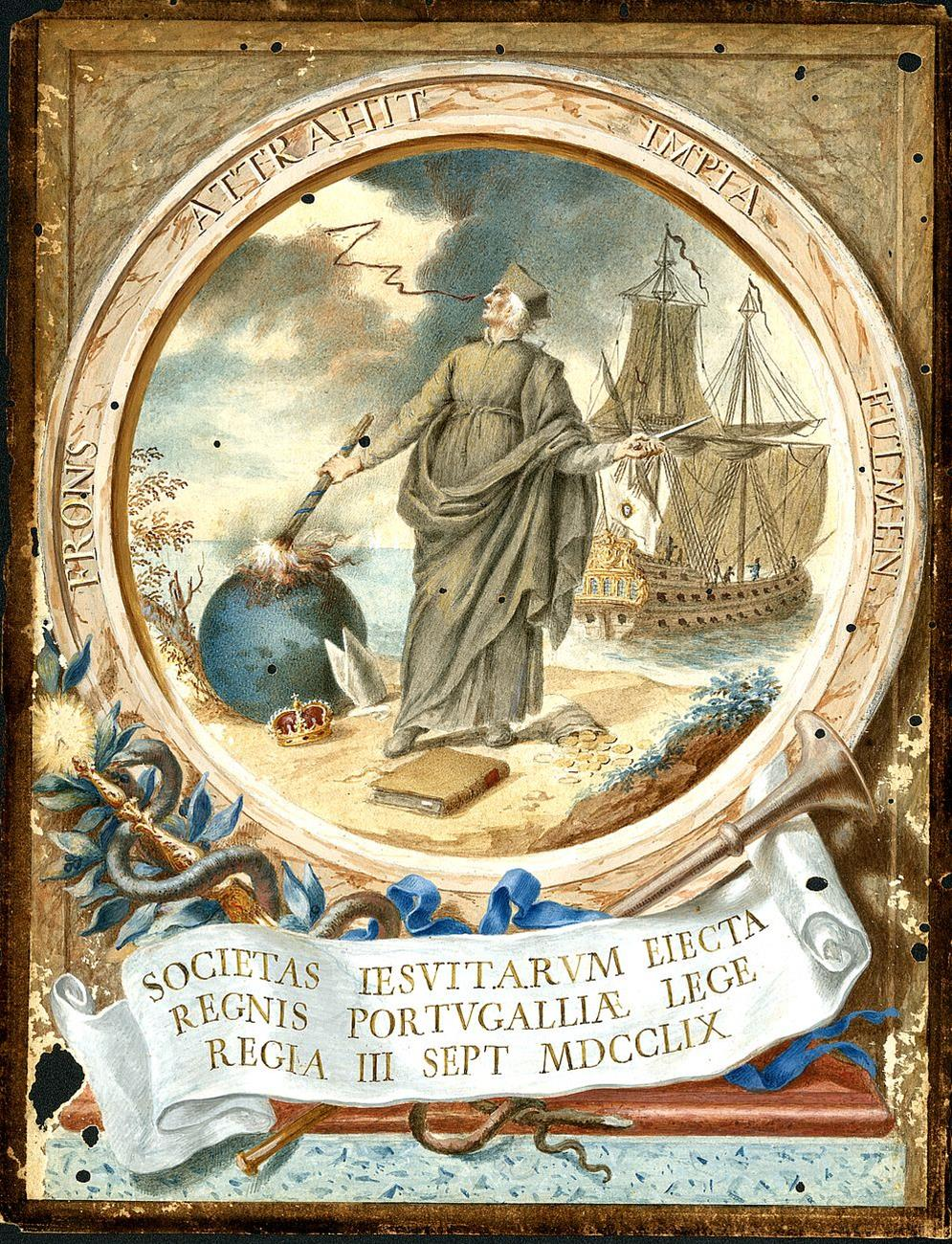
The Society of Jesus expelled from the Kingdom of Portugal by the Royal Decree of 3 September 1759; as a carrack sets sail from Portuguese shores in the background, a bolt of lightning strikes a Jesuit priest as he attempts to set a terrestrial globe, a mitre, and a royal crown on fire; a bag of gold coins and a closed book (symbols of wealth and control of education) lie at the priest's feet.

The suppression of the Society of Jesus was the removal of all members of the Jesuits from most of Western Europe and their respective colonies beginning in 1759 along with the abolition of the order by the Holy See in 1773; the papacy acceded to anti-Jesuit demands without much resistance. The Jesuits were serially expelled from the Portuguese Empire (1759), France (1764), the Kingdom of Naples and Kingdom of Sicily, Malta, Duchy of Parma and Piacenza, the Spanish Empire (1767) and Austria and Hungary (1782).

Historians identify multiple factors causing the suppression. The Jesuits, who were not above getting involved in politics, were distrusted for their closeness to the pope and his power in independent nations' religious and political affairs. In France, it was a combination of many influences, from Jansenism to free-thought, to the then-prevailing impatience with the Ancien Régime. Monarchies attempting to centralise and secularise political power viewed the Jesuits as supranational, too strongly allied to the papacy, and too autonomous from the monarchs in whose territory they operated.

With his papal brief Dominus ac Redemptor (21 July 1773), Pope Clement XIV suppressed the Society as a fait accompli. However, the order did not disappear. It continued underground operations in China, Russia, Prussia, and the United States. In Russia, Catherine the Great allowed the founding of a new novitiate. In 1814, a subsequent pope, Pius VII, acted to restore the Society of Jesus to its previous provinces, and the Jesuits began to resume their work in those countries.

== Background to suppression ==
Before the eighteenth-century suppression of the Jesuits in many countries, there had been earlier bans, such as in territories of the Venetian Republic between 1606 and 1656–1657, begun and ended as part of disputes between the Republic and the papacy, beginning with the Venetian Interdict.

By the mid-18th century, the Society had acquired a European reputation for political maneuvering and economic success. Monarchs in many European states grew increasingly wary of what they saw as undue interference from a foreign entity. The expulsion of Jesuits from their states had the added benefit of allowing governments to impound the Society's accumulated wealth and possessions. However, historian Charles Gibson (1966) cautions, "[h]ow far this served as a motive for the expulsion we do not know."

Various states took advantage of different events to take action. The series of political struggles between various monarchs, particularly France and Portugal, began with disputes over territory in 1750 and culminated in the suspension of diplomatic relations and the dissolution of the Society by the pope over most of Europe, and even some executions. The Portuguese Empire, France, Naples and Sicily, Parma, and the Spanish Empire were involved to a different extent.

The conflicts began with trade disputes in 1750 in Portugal, 1755 in France, and the late 1750s in Naples and Sicily. In 1758 the government of Joseph I of Portugal took advantage of the waning powers of Pope Benedict XIV and deported Jesuits from South America after relocating them with their native workers and then fighting a brief conflict (Guaraní War), formally suppressing the order in 1759. In 1762 the Parlement of Paris (a court, not a legislature) ruled against the Society in a huge bankruptcy case under pressure from a host of groups – from within the Church but also secular notables such as Madame de Pompadour, the king's mistress. Austria and the Two Sicilies suppressed the order by decree in 1767.

== Lead-up to suppression ==
=== First national suppression: Portugal and its empire in 1759 ===
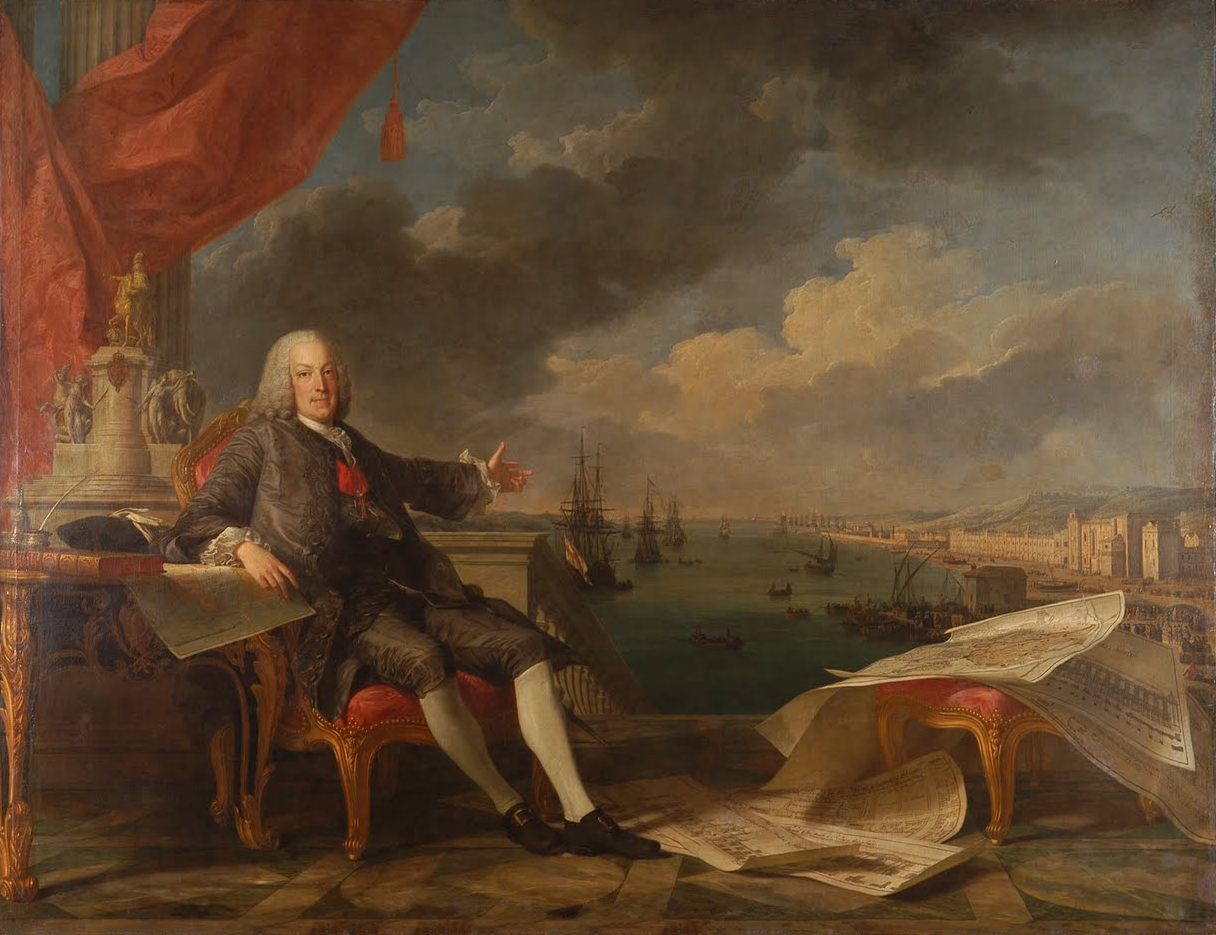
The Marquis of Pombal, Portugal's prime-minister at the time, oversaw the suppression of the Jesuits in Portugal and its empire. Painting by Louis-Michel van Loo, 1766.

There were long-standing tensions between the Portuguese crown and the Jesuits, which increased when the Count of Oeiras (later the Marquis of Pombal) became the monarch's minister of state, culminating in the expulsion of the Jesuits in 1759. The Távora affair in 1758 could be considered a pretext for the expulsion and crown confiscation of Jesuit assets. According to historians James Lockhart and Stuart B. Schwartz, the Jesuits' "independence, power, wealth, control of education, and ties to Rome made the Jesuits obvious targets for Pombal's brand of extreme regalism."

Portugal's quarrel with the Jesuits began over an exchange of South American colonial territory with Spain. By a secret treaty of 1750, Portugal relinquished to Spain the contested Colonia del Sacramento at the mouth of the Rio de la Plata in exchange for the Seven Reductions of Paraguay. These autonomous Jesuit missions had been nominal Spanish colonial territory. The native Guaraní, who lived in the mission territories, were ordered to quit their country and move to Uruguay. The Guaraní rose in arms against the transfer due to the harsh conditions, and the so-called Guaraní War ensued. It was a disaster for the Guaraní. In Portugal, a battle escalated, with inflammatory pamphlets denouncing or defending the Jesuits, who, for over a century, had protected the Guarani from enslavement by way of the Reductions. The Portuguese colonizers secured the expulsion of the Jesuits.

On 1 April 1758, Pombal persuaded the aged Pope Benedict XIV to appoint the Portuguese cardinal Francisco de Saldanha da Gama to investigate allegations against the Jesuits. Benedict was skeptical about the gravity of the alleged abuses. He ordered a "minute inquiry", but to safeguard the Society's reputation, all serious matters were to be referred back to him. Benedict died the following month, on May 3. On May 15, Saldanha, having received the papal brief only a fortnight before, declared that the Jesuits were guilty of having exercised "illicit, public, and scandalous commerce" in Portugal and its colonies. He had not visited Jesuit houses as ordered and pronounced on the issues the Pope had reserved for himself.

Pombal implicated the Jesuits in the Távora affair, an attempted assassination of the King on 3 September 1758, on the grounds of their friendship with some of the supposed conspirators. On 19 January 1759, he issued a decree sequestering the property of the Society in the Portuguese dominions. The following September, he deported the Portuguese fathers, about one thousand in number, to the Papal States, keeping the foreigners in prison. Among those arrested and executed was the then denounced Gabriel Malagrida, the Jesuit confessor of Leonor of Távora, for "crimes against the faith". After Malagrida's execution in 1759, the Portuguese crown suppressed the Society. The Portuguese ambassador was recalled from Rome, and the papal nuncio was expelled. Diplomatic relations between Portugal and Rome were broken off until 1770.

The painting Typus Religionis was seized from the Jesuit College in Billom in 1762 and used as evidence in a trial of the order. The prosecution claimed it was blasphemous and showed a lack of respect for the papacy and monarchy because it is an allegory of salvation with the pope and King of France depicted in less prominence than the saints.

=== Suppression in France in 1764 ===
The suppression of the Jesuits in France began in the French island colony of Martinique, where the Society of Jesus had a commercial stake in sugar plantations worked by black slaves and free labor. Their large mission plantations included large local populations that worked under the usual conditions of tropical colonial agriculture of the 18th century. The Catholic Encyclopedia in 1908 said that the practice of the missionaries occupying themselves personally in selling off the goods produced (an anomaly for a religious order) "was allowed partly to provide for the current expenses of the mission, partly to protect the simple, childlike natives from the common plague of dishonest intermediaries."

Father Antoine Lavalette, superior of the Martinique missions, became one of the largest land and slave owners on the island. But on the outbreak of war with Great Britain, ships carrying goods of an estimated value of 2,000,000 livres were captured, and Lavalette was unable to pay his very large debts and went bankrupt. His creditors turned to the Jesuit procurator in Paris to demand payment. Still, he refused responsibility for the debts of an independent mission – though he offered to negotiate for a settlement. The creditors went to the courts and received a favorable decision in 1760, obliging the Society to pay and giving leave to distrain in the case of non-payment.

On the advice of their lawyers, the Jesuits appealed to the Parlement of Paris. This turned out to be an imprudent step for their interests. Not only did the Parlement support the lower court on 8 May 1761, but having once gotten the case into its hands, the Jesuits' opponents in that assembly determined to strike a blow at the order. Under fire for currency speculation and accused of torturing and killing four slaves, Lavalette resigned from the Jesuit order in 1762.

The Jesuits had many who opposed them. The Jansenists were numerous among the enemies of the orthodox party. The Sorbonne, an educational rival, joined the Gallicans, the Philosophes, and the Encyclopédistes. Louis XV was weak; his wife and children were in favor of the Jesuits; his able first minister, the Duc de Choiseul, played into the hands of the Parlement and the royal mistress, Madame de Pompadour, to whom the Jesuits had refused absolution since she was living in sin with the King of France, was a determined opponent. The determination of the Parlement of Paris in time bore down all opposition.

The attack on the Jesuits was opened on 17 April 1762 by the Jansenist sympathizer Abbé Henri Philippe de Chauvelin, who denounced the Constitution of the Society of Jesus, which was publicly examined and discussed in a hostile press. The Parlement issued its Extraits des assertions, assembled from passages from Jesuit theologians and canonists, alleging then to have taught every sort of immorality and error. On 6 August 1762, the final arrêt was proposed to the Parlement by the Advocate General Joly de Fleury, condemning the Society to extinction. Still, the King's intervention brought eight months delay, and in the meantime, a compromise was suggested by the Court. If the French Jesuits separated from the Society headed by the Jesuit General directly under the pope's authority and came under a French vicar, with French customs, as with the Gallican Church, the Crown would still protect them. The French Jesuits, rejecting Gallicanism, refused to consent. On 1 April 1763, the colleges were closed, and by a further arrêt of March 9, 1764, the Jesuits were required to renounce their vows under pain of banishment.

At the end of November 1764, the King signed an edict dissolving the Society throughout his dominions, though some provincial parlements still protected them, such as Franche-Comté, Alsace, and Artois. In the draft of the edict, he canceled numerous clauses that implied that the Society was guilty, and writing to the Duke of Choiseul, he concluded: "If I adopt the advice of others for the peace of my realm, you must make the changes I propose, or I will do nothing. I say no more, lest I should say too much."

==== Decline of the Jesuits in New France ====
Following the British 1759 victory against the French in Quebec, France lost its North American territory of New France, where Jesuit missionaries in the seventeenth century had been active among indigenous peoples. British rule had implications for Jesuits in New France, but their numbers and sites were already in decline. As early as 1700, the Jesuits had adopted a policy of merely maintaining their existing posts instead of trying to establish new ones beyond Quebec, Montreal, and Ottawa.

Once New France was under British control, the British barred the immigration of any further Jesuits. By 1763, only twenty-one Jesuits were still stationed in what was now the British colony of Quebec. By 1773, only eleven Jesuits remained. The British crown claimed Jesuit property in Canada in the same year and declared that the Society of Jesus in New France was dissolved.

=== Spanish Empire suppression of 1767 ===
==== Events leading to the Spanish suppression ====
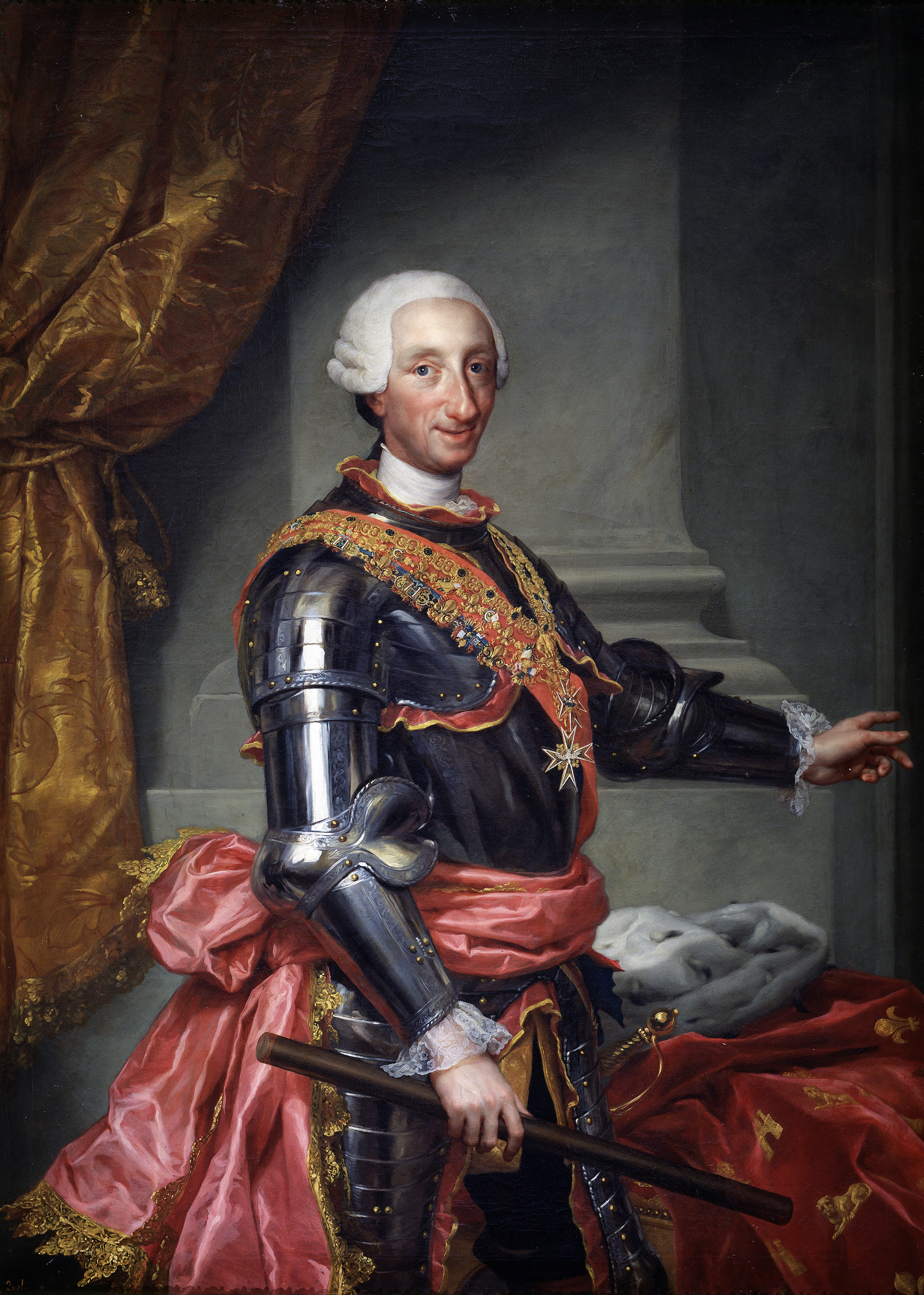
Charles III of Spain, who ordered the expulsion of the Jesuits from Spanish realms

The Suppression in Spain and the Spanish colonies, and in its dependencies the Kingdom of Naples and Kingdom of Sicily, was the last of the expulsions, with Portugal (1759) and France (1764) having already set the pattern. The Spanish crown had already begun a series of administrative and other changes in their overseas empire, such as reorganizing the viceroyalties, rethinking economic policies, and establishing a military, so the expulsion of the Jesuits is seen as part of this general trend known generally as the Bourbon Reforms. The reforms aimed to curb American-born Spaniards' increasing autonomy and self-confidence, reassert crown control, and increase revenues. Some historians doubt that the Jesuits were guilty of intrigues against the Spanish crown that were used as the immediate cause for the expulsion.

Contemporaries in Spain attributed the suppression of the Jesuits to the Esquilache Riots, named after the Italian minister to Bourbon King Charles III, that erupted after a sumptuary law was enacted. The law, which placed restrictions on men's wearing of voluminous capes and limiting the breadth of sombreros men could wear, was seen as an "insult to Castilian pride."

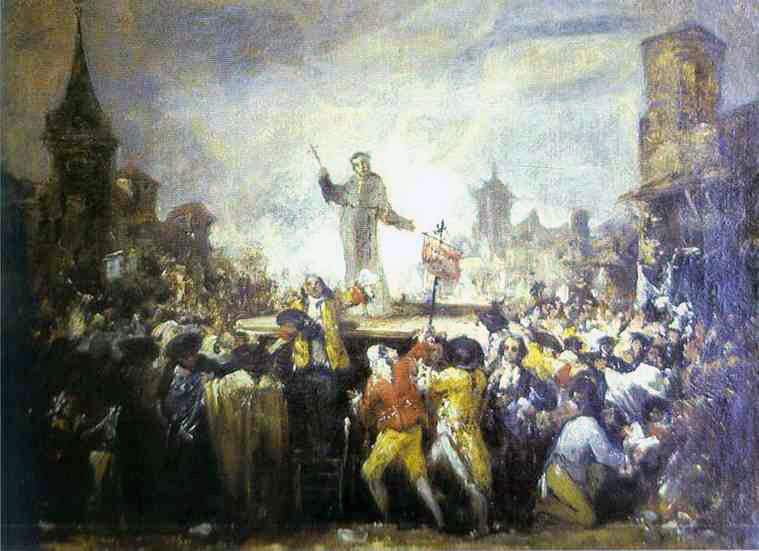
Motín de Esquilache, Madrid, attributed to Francisco de Goya (c. 1766, 1767)

King Charles fled to the countryside when an angry crowd of those resisters converged on the royal palace. The crowd shouted, "Long Live Spain! Death to Esquilache!" His Flemish palace guard fired warning shots over the people's heads. An account says that a group of Jesuit priests appeared on the scene, soothed the protesters with speeches, and sent them home. Charles decided to rescind the tax hike and hat-trimming edict and fire his finance minister.

The monarch and his advisers were alarmed by the uprising, which challenged royal authority. The Jesuits were accused of inciting the mob and publicly accusing the monarch of religious crimes. Pedro Rodríguez de Campomanes, attorney for the Council of Castile, the Spanish council of state, articulated this view in a report the King read. Charles ordered convening a special royal commission to draw up a master plan to expel the Jesuits. The commission first met in January 1767. It modeled its plan on the tactics deployed by France's Philip IV against the Knights Templar in 1307 – emphasizing the element of surprise. Charles' adviser Campomanes had written a treatise on the Templars in 1747, which may have informed the implementation of the Jesuit suppression. One historian states, "[Charles] never would have dared to expel the Jesuits had he not been assured of the support of an influential party within the Spanish Church." Jansenists and mendicant orders had long opposed the Jesuits and sought to curtail their power.

==== Secret plan of expulsion ====
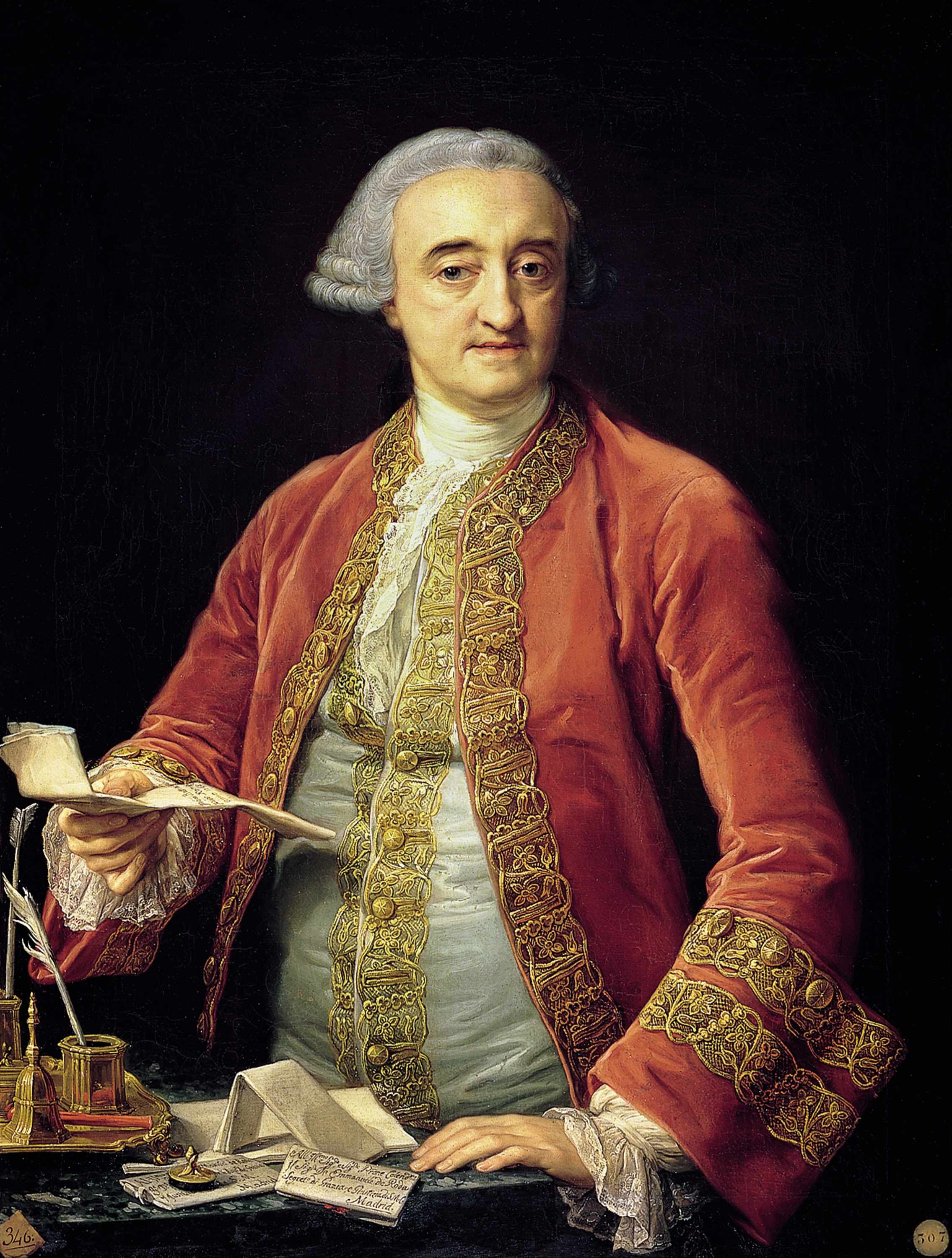
Manuel de Roda, adviser to Charles III, who brought together an alliance of those opposed to the Jesuits

King Charles' ministers kept their deliberations to themselves, as did the King, who acted upon "urgent, just, and necessary reasons, which I reserve in my royal mind." The correspondence of Bernardo Tanucci, Charles' anti-clerical minister in Naples, contains the ideas that, from time to time, guided Spanish policy. Charles conducted his government through the Count of Aranda, a reader of Voltaire, and other liberals.

The commission's meeting on 29 January 1767 planned the expulsion of the Jesuits. Secret orders, to be opened at sunrise on April 2, were sent to all provincial viceroys and district military commanders in Spain. Each sealed envelope contained two documents. One was a copy of the original order expelling "all members of the Society of Jesus" from Charles' Spanish domains and confiscating all their goods. The other instructed local officials to surround the Jesuit colleges and residences on the night of April 2, arrest the Jesuits, and arrange their passage to ships awaiting them at various ports. King Charles' closing sentence read: "If a single Jesuit, even though sick or dying, is still to be found in the area under your command after the embarkation, prepare yourself to face summary execution."

Pope Clement XIII, presented with a similar ultimatum by the Spanish ambassador a few days before the decree would take effect, asked King Charles, "by what authority?" and threatened him with eternal damnation. Pope Clement could not enforce his protest, and the expulsion occurred as planned.

==== Jesuits expelled from Mexico (New Spain) ====
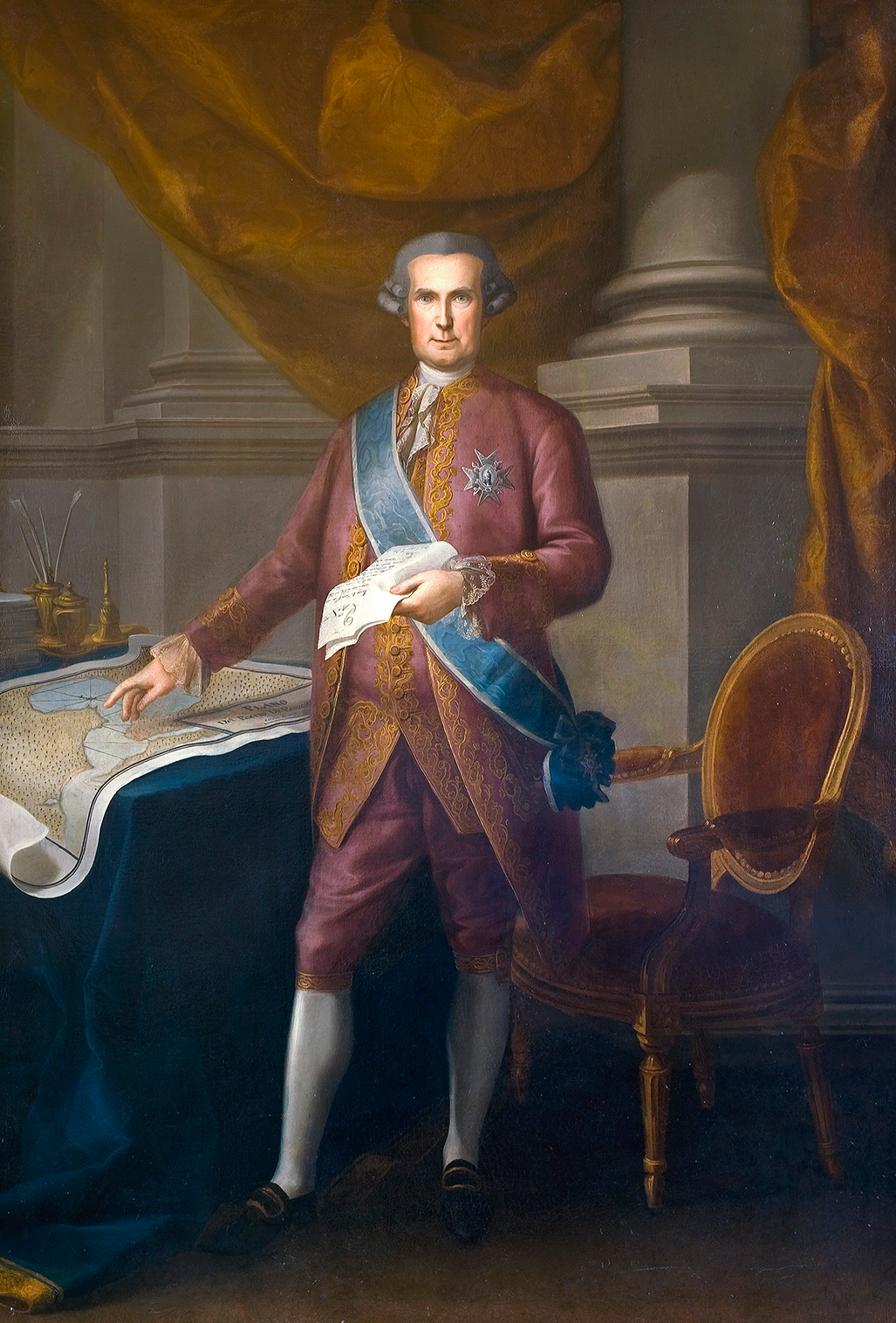
José de Gálvez, Visitador generál in New Spain (1765–71), was instrumental in the Jesuit expulsion in 1767 in Mexico, considered part of the Bourbon Reforms.

In New Spain, the Jesuits had actively evangelized the Indians on the northern frontier. But their main activity involved educating elite criollo (American-born Spanish) men, many of whom themselves became Jesuits. Of the 678 Jesuits expelled from Mexico, 75% were Mexican-born. In late June 1767, Spanish soldiers removed the Jesuits from their 16 missions and 32 stations in Mexico. No Jesuit could be excepted from the King's decree, no matter how old or ill. Many died on the trek along the cactus-studded trail to the Gulf Coast port of Veracruz, where ships awaited them to transport them to Italian exile.

There were protests in Mexico at the exile of so many Jesuit members of elite families. But the Jesuits themselves obeyed the order. Since the Jesuits had owned extensive landed estates in Mexico – which supported their evangelization of indigenous peoples and their education mission to criollo elites – the properties became a source of wealth for the crown. The crown auctioned them off, benefiting the treasury, and their criollo purchasers gained productive well-run properties. Many criollo families felt outraged at the crown's actions, regarding it as a "despotic act." One well-known Mexican Jesuit, Francisco Javier Clavijero, during his Italian exile, wrote an important history of Mexico, with emphasis on the indigenous peoples. Alexander von Humboldt, the famous German scientist who spent a year in Mexico in 1803–04, praised Clavijero's work on the history of Mexico's indigenous peoples.

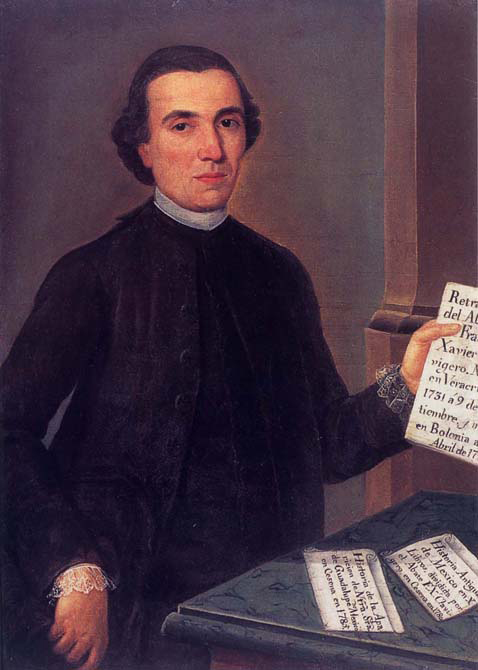
Francisco Javier Clavijero, Mexican Jesuit exiled to Italy. His history of ancient Mexico was a significant text for pride for contemporaries in New Spain. He is revered in modern Mexico as a creole patriot.

Due to the isolation of the Spanish missions on the Baja California peninsula, the expulsion decree did not arrive there until the new governor, Gaspar de Portolá, arrived on November 30. By 3 February 1768, Portolá's soldiers had removed the peninsula's 16 Jesuit missionaries from their posts and gathered them in Loreto, whence they sailed to the Mexican mainland and thence to Europe. Showing sympathy for the Jesuits, Portolá treated them kindly, even as he ended their 70 years of mission-building in Baja, California. The Jesuit missions in Baja California were turned over to the Franciscans and subsequently to the Dominicans, and the future missions in Alta California were founded by Franciscans.

The change in the Spanish colonies in the New World was particularly great, as missions often dominated the far-flung settlements. Almost overnight, in the mission towns of Sonora and Arizona, the "black robes" (Jesuits) disappeared, and the "gray robes" (Franciscans) replaced them.

==== Expulsion from the Philippines ====
The Jesuits were soon dislodged from the Philippines which they had helped convert from Animism, Hinduism, and Islam. The royal decree expelling the Society of Jesus from Spain and its dominions reached the capital of Manila on 17 May 1768. Between 1769 and 1771, the Jesuits were transported from the Spanish East Indies to Spain and deported to Italy.

==== Exile of Spanish Jesuits to Italy ====
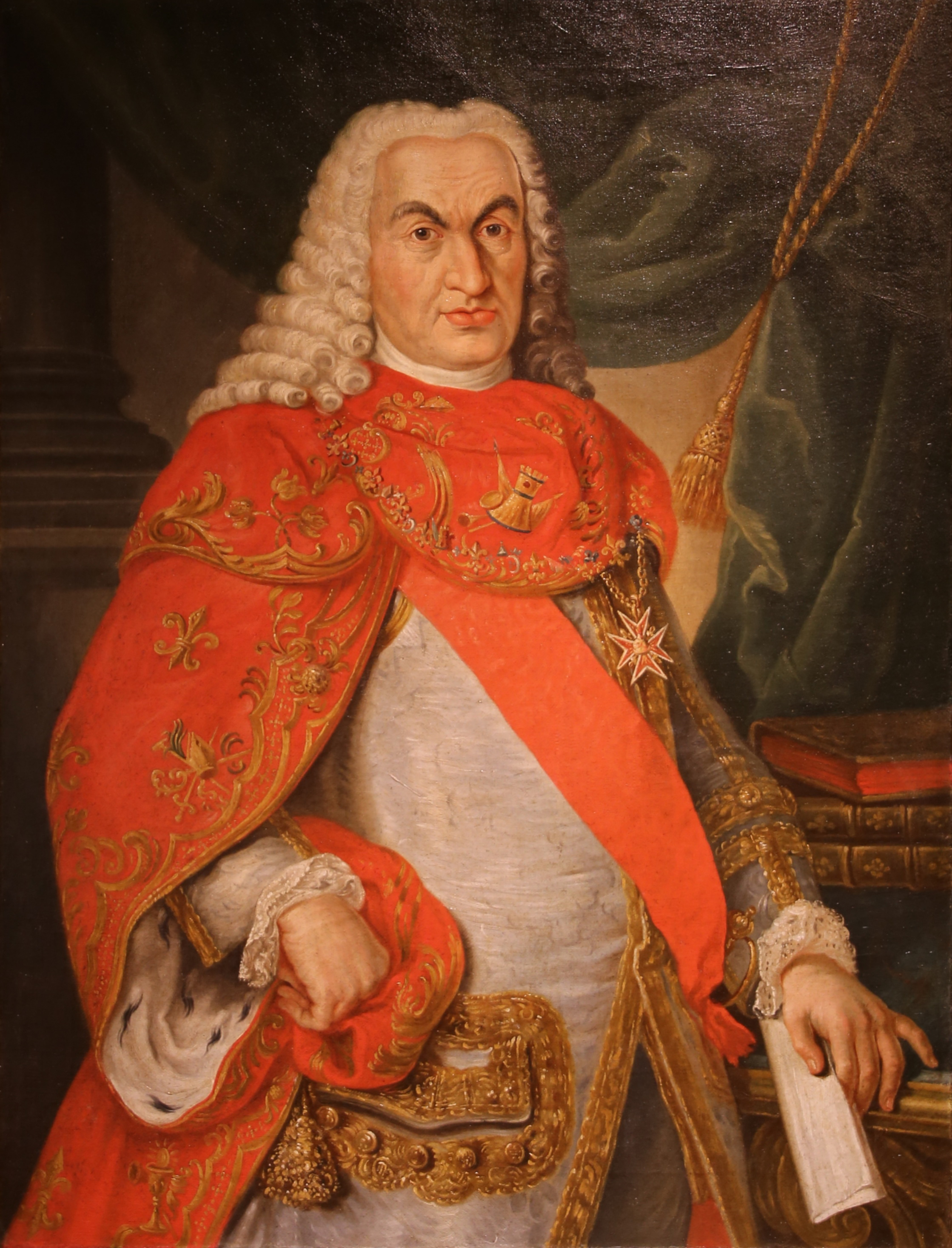
Bernardo Tanucci, adviser to Charles III, instrumental in the expulsion of the Jesuits in Naples

Spanish soldiers rounded up the Jesuits in Mexico, marched them to the coasts, and placed them below the decks of Spanish warships headed for the Italian port of Civitavecchia in the Papal States. When they arrived, Pope Clement XIII refused to allow the ships to unload their prisoners onto Papal territory. Fired upon by batteries of artillery from the shore of Civitavecchia, the Spanish warships had to look for an anchorage off the island of Corsica, then a dependency of Genoa. But since a rebellion had erupted on Corsica, it took five months for some of the Jesuits to set foot on land.

Several historians have estimated the number of Jesuits deported at 6,000. But it is unclear whether this figure encompasses Spain alone or extends to Spain's overseas colonies (notably Mexico and the Philippines). Jesuit historian Hubert Becher claims that about 600 Jesuits died during their voyage and waiting ordeal.

In Naples, King Charles' minister Bernardo Tanucci pursued a similar policy: On November 3, the Jesuits, without accusation or trial, were marched across the border into the Papal States and threatened with death if they returned.

Historian Charles Gibson calls the Spanish crown's expulsion of the Jesuits a "sudden and devastating move" to assert royal control. However, the Jesuits became a vulnerable target for the crown's moves to assert more control over the church; also, some religious and diocesan clergy and civil authorities were hostile to them, and they did not protest their expulsion.

In addition to 1767, the Jesuits were suppressed and banned twice more in Spain, in 1834 and 1932. Spanish ruler Francisco Franco rescinded the last suppression in 1938.

==== Economic impact on the Spanish Empire ====
The suppression of the order had longstanding economic effects in the Americas, particularly those areas where they had their missions or reductions – outlying areas dominated by indigenous peoples such as Paraguay and Chiloé Archipelago. In Misiones, in modern-day Argentina, their suppression led to the scattering and enslavement of indigenous Guaranís living in the reductions and a long-term decline in the yerba mate industry, from which it only recovered in the 20th century.

In Ocoa, Valparaíso Region, Chile, folklore says Jesuits left behind a large entierro following their suppression.

With the suppression of the Society of Jesus in Spanish America, Jesuit vineyards in Peru were auctioned, but new owners did not have the same expertise as the Jesuits, contributing to a decline in production of wine and pisco.

=== Suppression in Malta ===
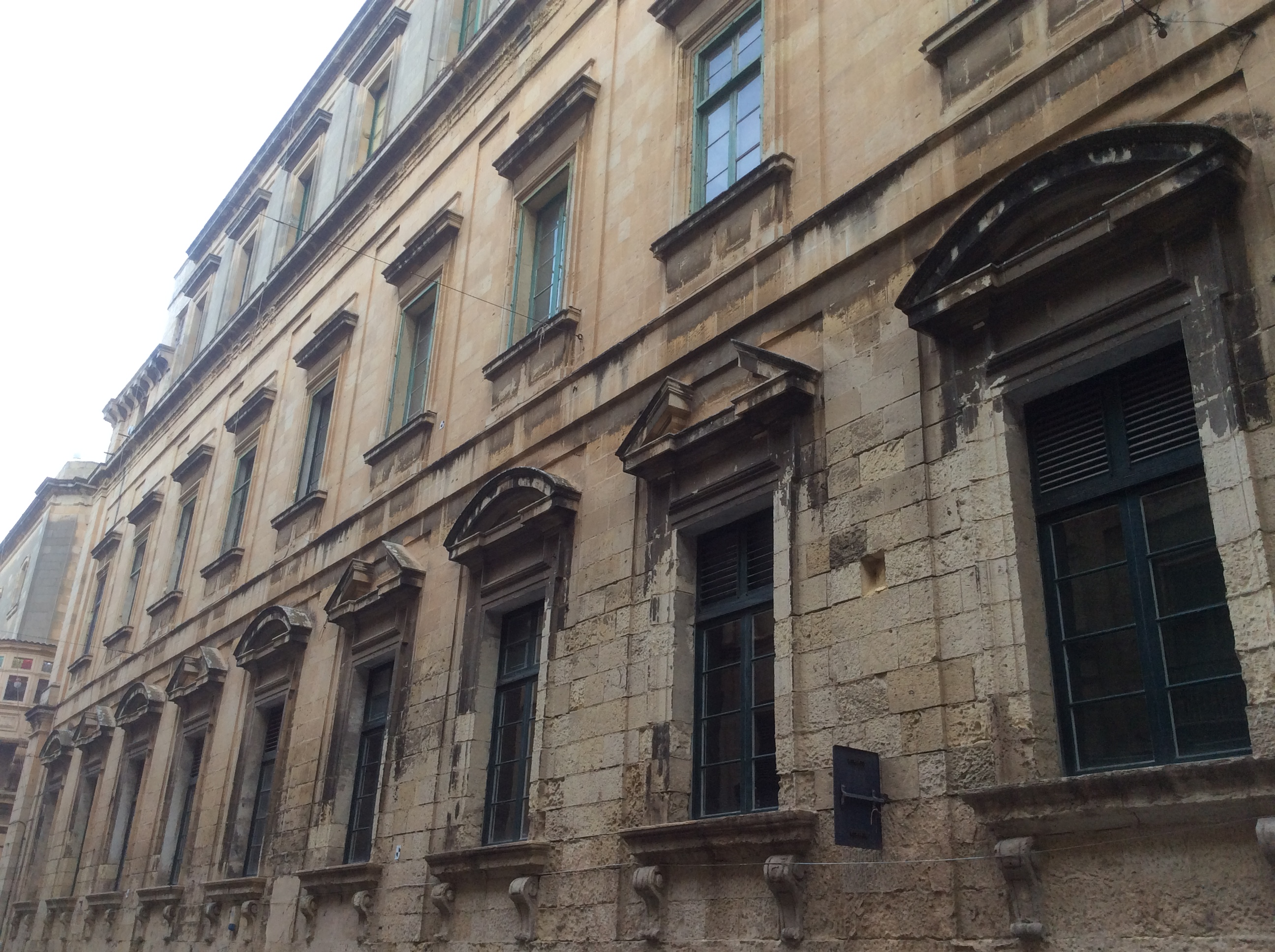
The former Jesuit Collegium Melitense in Valletta, which became the University of Malta after the suppression.

Hospitaller Malta was at the time a vassal of the Kingdom of Sicily, and Grandmaster Manuel Pinto da Fonseca, himself a Portuguese, followed suit, expelling the Jesuits from the island and seizing their assets. These assets were used in establishing the University of Malta by a decree signed by Pinto on 22 November 1769, with a lasting effect on Malta's social and cultural life. The Church of the Jesuits (in Maltese Knisja tal-Ġiżwiti), one of the oldest churches in Valletta, retains this name up to the present.

=== Expulsion from the Duchy of Parma ===
The independent Duchy of Parma and Piacenza was the smallest Bourbon court. So aggressive in its anti-clericalism was the Parmesan reaction to the news of the expulsion of the Jesuits from Naples, that Pope Clement XIII addressed a public warning against it on 30 January 1768, threatening the duchy with ecclesiastical censures. At this, all the Bourbon courts turned against the Holy See, demanding the entire dissolution of the Jesuits. Parma expelled the Jesuits from its territories, confiscating their possessions.

=== Dissolution in Poland and Lithuania ===
The Jesuit order was disbanded in the Polish–Lithuanian Commonwealth in 1773. However, in the territories occupied by the Russian Empire in the First Partition of Poland the Society was not disbanded, as Russian Empress Catherine the Great dismissed the papal decree.

In the Commonwealth, the Society's possessions were substantial; in the Grand Duchy of Lithuania alone, by the 1770s, the Jesuits managed around 90 institutions across the Lithuanian and Masovian provinces. They owned approximately 250,000 hectares (620,000 acres) of land and vast forests, with peasants performing significant corvée labor. Following the suppression, this property was taken over by the Commission of National Education, the world's first Ministry of Education, and the collegiums were transformed into secular schools.

== Papal suppression of 1773 ==
After the suppression of the Jesuits in many European countries and their overseas empires, Pope Clement XIV issued a papal brief on 21 July 1773 in Rome titled Dominus ac Redemptor Noster. That decree included the following statement.

...we have noticed that the Society of Jesus is no longer able to produce the very rich fruits and usefulness for which it was founded and approved and enhanced with so many privileges by our predecessors. Now there is question of the Society, of its Institute, and of its privileges, which assimilate it to the mendicant orders. From sure knowledge and fullness of apostolic power, we abolish and suppress the oft-mentioned Society. We take away and abrogate each and every one of its offices, ministries, administrations, houses, schools, colleges, retreats, farms, and any properties in whatsoever province, realm, and jurisdiction and in whatever way pertaining to the Society. We do away with the statutes customs, usages, decrees, Constitutions, even those confirmed by oath, by apostolic approval, or by other means. We wish that the present document, as if corresponding word for word to all the Society’s privileges and indults, both general and special, fully and sufficiently does away with them even if the privileges were formulated with legal safeguards. Therefore we declare that all authority in both spiritual and temporal matters of the Father General, the provincials, the visitors, and of any other superiors of the said Society is permanently discontinued and completely abolished.

— Pope Clement XIV, Dominus ac Redemptor Noster

=== Resistance in Belgium ===
After papal suppression in 1773, the scholarly Jesuit Society of Bollandists moved from Antwerp to Brussels, where they continued their work in the monastery of the Coudenberg; in 1788, the Bollandist Society was suppressed by the government of the Austrian Netherlands.

=== Continued Jesuit work in Prussia ===
Frederick the Great of Prussia refused to allow the papal document of suppression to be distributed in his country. The order continued in Prussia for several years after the suppression, although it had dissolved before the 1814 restoration.

=== Continued work in North America ===
Many individual Jesuits continued their work as Jesuits in Quebec, although the last one died in 1800. The 21 Jesuits living in North America signed a document offering their submission to Rome in 1774. In the United States, schools and colleges continued to be run and founded by Jesuits.

=== Russian resistance to suppression ===
In Imperial Russia, Catherine the Great refused to allow the papal document of suppression to be distributed and even openly defended the Jesuits from dissolution.

Catherine took advantage of the canonical requirement that a papal brief could only take effect after being publicly proclaimed by the monarch; she strictly forbade the publication of Dominus ac Redemptor. Her decision was driven by pragmatic political and social considerations regarding the newly annexed territories of Belarus (following the First Partition of Poland in 1772).

Firstly, the Jesuits in the Belarusian governorates were the first among Catholic orders to swear allegiance to the Empress, thereby setting an example for the local population and ensuring stability in the region. Secondly, Catherine valued the Jesuits' educational system; preserving their schools and collegiums (which offered free education) avoided the collapse of the local educational network and the need to import foreign clergy. Finally, by protecting the Jesuits against the Pope's will, Catherine aimed to weaken the Holy See's influence over her Catholic subjects and assert state control over the church hierarchy. The Empress also permitted the opening of a novitiate in Belarus, ensuring the order's continuity.

The Jesuit chapter in Belarus received her patronage. It ordained priests, operated schools, and opened housing for novitiates and tertianships. Catherine's successor, Paul I, successfully asked Pope Pius VII in 1801 for formal approval of the Jesuit operation in Russia. The Jesuits, led first by Franciszek Kareu, a Polish Welshman, followed by the Austrian Slovene, Gabriel Gruber and after his death by Tadeusz Brzozowski, continued to expand in Russia under Alexander I, adding missions and schools in Astrakhan, Moscow, Riga, Saratov, and St. Petersburg and throughout the Caucasus and Siberia. Many former Jesuits throughout Europe traveled to Russia to join the sanctioned order there.

Alexander I withdrew his patronage of the Jesuits in 1812, but with the restoration of the Society in 1814, that only temporarily affected the order. Alexander eventually expelled all Jesuits from Imperial Russia in March 1820.

=== Russian patronage of restoration in Europe and North America ===
Under the patronage of the "Russian Society", Jesuit provinces were effectively reconstituted in the United Kingdom of Great Britain and Ireland in 1803 (having been prohibited in England by the Jesuits, etc. Act 1584), the Kingdom of Sicily in 1803, and the United States in 1805. "Russian" chapters were also formed in Belgium, Italy, the Netherlands, and Switzerland.

=== Acquiescence in Austria and Hungary ===
The Secularization Decree of Joseph II (Holy Roman Emperor from 1765 to 1790 and ruler of the Habsburg lands from 1780 to 1790) issued on 12 January 1782 for Austria and Hungary banned several monastic orders not involved in teaching or healing. It liquidated 140 monasteries (home to 1484 monks and 190 nuns). The banned monastic orders included Jesuits, Camaldolese, Order of Friars Minor Capuchin, Carmelites, Carthusians, Poor Clares, Order of Saint Benedict, Cistercians, Dominican Order (Order of Preachers), Franciscans, Pauline Fathers and Premonstratensians, and their wealth was taken over by the Religious Fund.

His anti-clerical and liberal innovations induced Pope Pius VI to visit Joseph II in March 1782. He received the Pope politely and presented himself as a good Catholic but refused to be influenced.

=== Role in the Latin American Wars of Independence ===
The Jesuits had set up various Reductions in Spanish Latin America and the Spanish Philippines, these were theocratic Christian city-states often semi-independent from colonial control, wherein the native populations were actively protected and enculturated by Roman Catholic Orders. The Jesuit missions among the Guaraní are among the most successful. However, the immediate suppression of the Jesuit Order put an end to the reduction system. As a result, native wealth therein were sequestered by colonial authorities and the natives enslaved. According to David Brading, this was one of the factors for the Latin American Wars of Independence, which sought to avenge the suppression of the Jesuits and the looting of Indigenous resources.

== Restoration of the Jesuits ==
As the Napoleonic Wars were approaching their end in 1814, the old political order of Europe was to a considerable extent restored at the Congress of Vienna after years of fighting and revolution, during which the Church had been persecuted as an agent of the old order and abused under the rule of Napoleon. With the political climate of Europe changed, and with the monarchs who had called for the suppression of the Society no longer in power, Pope Pius VII issued an order restoring the Society of Jesus in the Catholic countries of Europe. For its part, the Society of Jesus decided at the first General Congregation held after the restoration to keep the organization of the Society as it had been before the suppression was ordered in 1773.

After 1815, with the Restoration, the Catholic Church again began to play a more welcome role in European political life. Nation by nation, the Jesuits became re-established.

== Assessment ==
The modern view is that the order's suppression resulted from political and economic conflicts rather than a theological controversy and the assertion of nation-state independence against the Catholic Church. The expulsion of the Society of Jesus from the Catholic nations of Europe and their colonial empires is also seen as one of the early manifestations of the new secularist zeitgeist of the Enlightenment. It peaked with the anti-clericalism of the French Revolution. The suppression was also seen as an attempt by monarchs to gain control of revenues and trade that the Society of Jesus previously dominated. Catholic historians often point to a personal conflict between Pope Clement XIII (1758–1769) and his supporters within the church and the crown cardinals backed by France.

== See also ==
- Society of the Faith of Jesus
- Jesuit clause – clause banning Jesuits from Norway from 1814 to 1956
- Swiss constitution after the Sonderbund War - ban on Jesuits from 1848 to 1973
- Jesuits, etc. Act 1584 and Jesuits etc. Act 1603, penal laws in England repealed between 1778 and 1846
- Jesuit Law - law banning Jesuits from Germany between 1872-1917
- Expulsion of congregations

== Bibliography ==
- Casalini, Cristiano (2017). "Rise, Character, and Development of Jesuit Education". In Županov, Ines G. (ed.). The Oxford Handbook of Jesuits. New York: Oxford University Press. ISBN 978-0190639631.
- Maryks, Robert A.; Wright, Jonathan (2015). "Introduction". In Maryks, Robert A.; Wright, Jonathan (eds.). Jesuit Survival and Restoration: A Global History, 1773–1900. Boston: Brill. ISBN 978-9004282384.
- Schlafly, Daniel L. Jr. (2015). "General Repression, Russian Survival, American Success: The 'Russian' Society of Jesus and the Jesuits in the United States". In Burson, Jeffrey D. (ed.). The Jesuit Suppression in Global Context: Causes, Events, and Consequences. New York: Cambridge University Press. ISBN 978-1107030589.
