= Abayev =

Abayev or Abaev is a surname. Notable people with the surname include:

- Akhsarbek Abaev (1923–1982), Ossetian Red Army Sergeant and Hero of the Soviet Union
- Dauren Abaev (born 1979), Kazakh politician and diplomat
- Eli Abaev (born 1998), American-Israeli basketball player for Hapoel Be'er Sheva in the Israeli Basketball Premier League
- Genrikh Abaev (1932–2014), Belarusian professor
- Ilya Abayev (born 1981), Russian footballer
- Vasily Abaev (1900–2001), Ossetian Soviet linguist
