= Giovanni Antonio Grassi =

Italian Jesuit missionary, educator, and superior

The Very Reverend Giovanni Antonio Grassi SJ
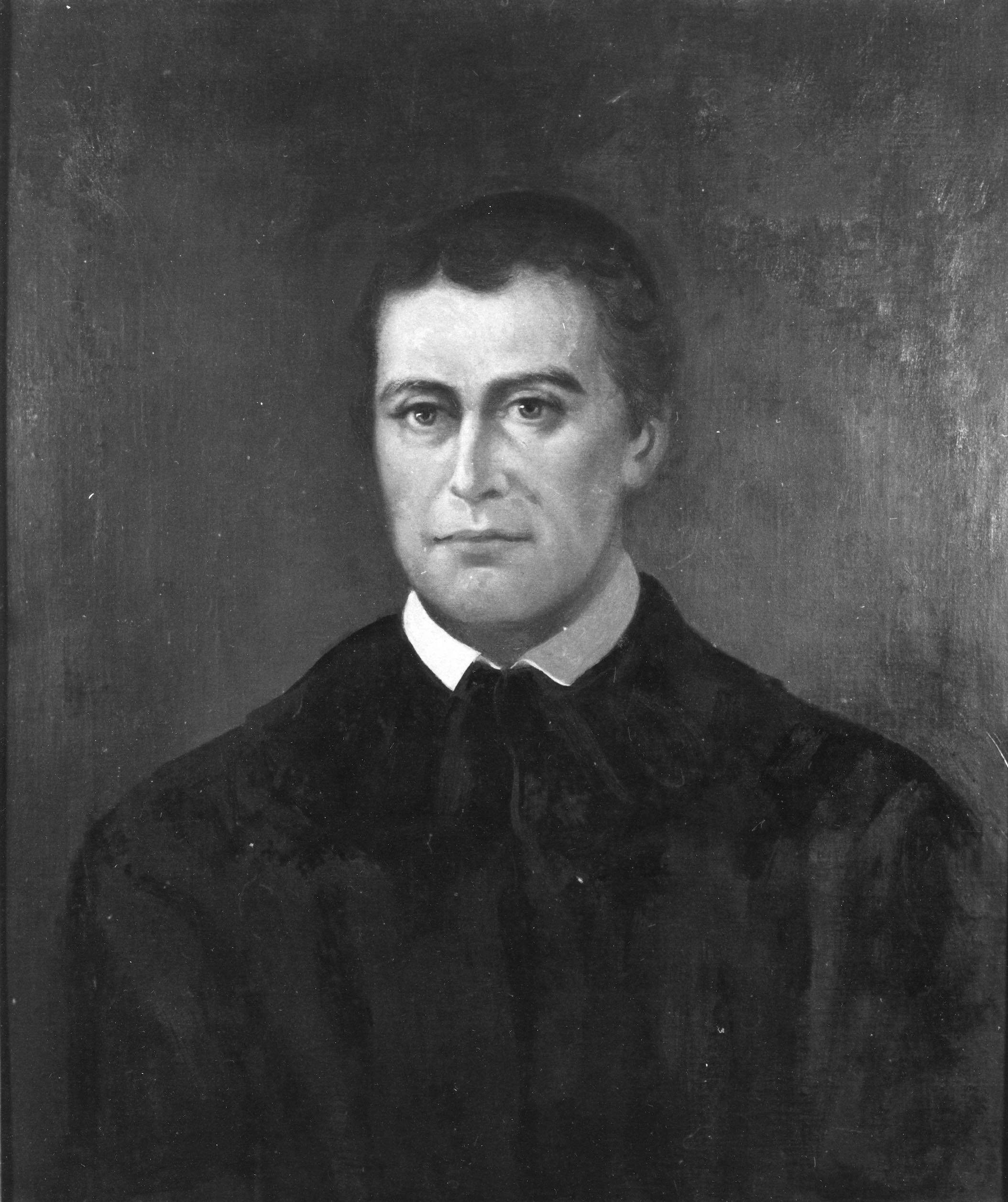

27th Rector of the Pontificio Collegio Urbano de Propaganda Fide
- In office 1840–1842
- Preceded by: Liberio Figari
- Succeeded by: Giovanni Batta Dessi

9th President of Georgetown College
- In office 1812–1817
- Preceded by: Francis Neale
- Succeeded by: Benedict Joseph Fenwick

Personal details
- Born: 10 September 1775 Schilpario, Lombardy, Republic of Venice
- Died: 12 December 1849 (aged 74) Rome, Papal States
- Education: Jesuit College in Polotsk

Giovanni Antonio Grassi SJ (anglicized as John Anthony Grassi; 10 September 1775 – 12 December 1849) was an Italian Catholic priest and Jesuit who led many academic and religious institutions in Europe and the United States, including Georgetown College in Washington, D.C., and the Pontificio Collegio Urbano de Propaganda Fide in Rome.

Born in the Republic of Venice, Grassi was a promising student of mathematics and the natural sciences, especially astronomy. He completed his studies at the Jesuit College in Polotsk, in the Russian Empire, in 1804 and was appointed rector of the Institute for Nobles. The following year, he was ordered to replace the last remaining Jesuit missionary in China; this began a five-year journey across Europe in which he was ultimately unable to secure passage to the distant country. He instead began teaching at Stonyhurst College in England.

Grassi was sent to the United States in 1810, where he became the superior of the Jesuits' Maryland Mission and the president of Georgetown College. For significantly improving its curriculum and public reputation, as well as obtaining its congressional charter, Grassi became known as Georgetown's "second founder". He returned to Rome in 1817 as Archbishop Leonard Neale's representative before the Congregation de Propaganda Fide. He later became the rector of the College of the Holy Martyrs in Turin and provincial superior of the Jesuits' Turin Province. Grassi became a close confidant of King Charles Felix of Sardinia and spent time in Naples as confessor to Charles Felix's widow, Queen Maria Cristina. He also intervened on behalf of Charles Albert to allow him to succeed Charles Felix on the throne. In 1835, Grassi moved to Rome as the rector of the Pontificio Collegio Urbano de Propaganda Fide, a school for missionaries, and was later named the Jesuit Superior General's assistant for Italy.

== Early life and education ==
Giovanni Antonio Grassi was born on 10 September 1775 in Schilpario, Lombardy, in the Republic of Venice. He studied under the Somaschi Fathers, before going to the diocesan seminary of Bergamo, where he studied theology for two years and was ordained a priest. On 16 November 1799, Grassi entered the Society of Jesus, which had been officially suppressed by the pope since 1773. He proceeded to the Jesuit novitiate in Colorno, on 21 November 1799, becoming one of the novitiate's first students.

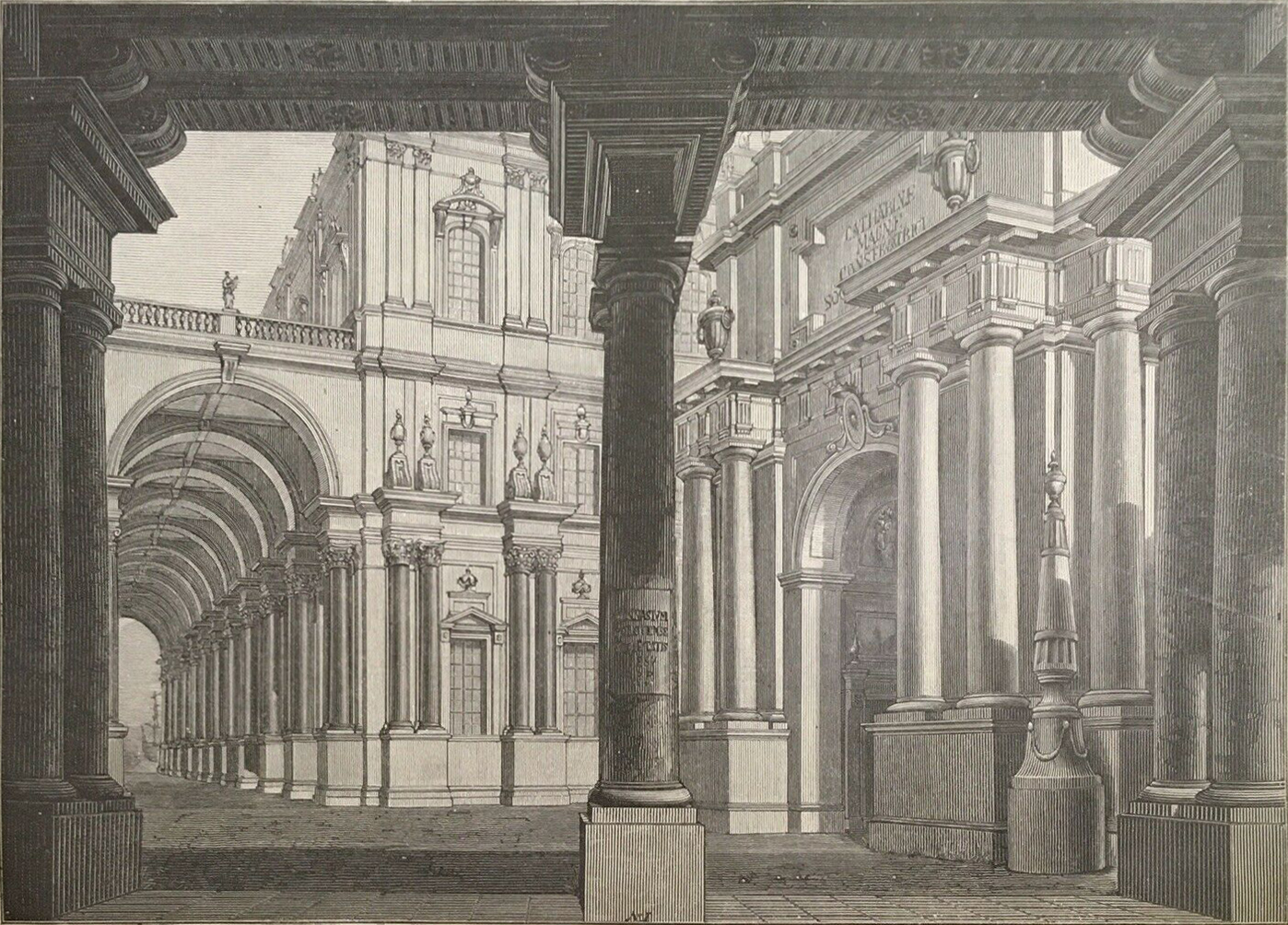
Entrance to the Jesuit College in Polotsk in 1800

Due to the nearly worldwide suppression of the Jesuit order, the novices at Colorno were allowed only to pronounce their simple vows. Because Empress Catherine the Great had declined to suppress the Jesuits, (Note: At Catherine II's request, Pope Pius VII granted the Jesuits special permission to operate in Russia, despite their worldwide suppression.) the order fled Western Europe and survived in the Russian Empire, and Polotsk (in present-day Belarus) became the order's center. Grassi went to the Jesuit College in Polotsk in 1801 to complete his priestly education, while the master of novices of the Colorno novitiate, Joseph Pignatelli, assured him that he would eventually return to Italy. Grassi was an excellent student in the natural sciences, and he completed his theological studies at the college in Polotsk in 1804. He then became the rector of the college's Institute for Nobles and a teacher of higher mathematics.

=== European voyage ===
Upon completing his education, Grassi began preparing for an assignment to minister to Armenians in Astrakhan, and was studying Armenian. He and two others were then summoned to Saint Petersburg by Gabriel Gruber, the Jesuit Superior General. (Note: During the suppression of the Society of Jesus, the Superior General resided in Saint Petersburg, and later in Polotsk.) On their arrival on 19 January 1805, Gruber informed them that they would be sent to Peking to replace the one remaining Jesuit missionary in China, Louis Antoine de Poirot. The Superior General determined that it would be preferable for the missionaries to travel by sea, rather than overland with a departing Russian delegation.

The General outfitted them with new vestments and chalices for celebrating Mass, mathematical and scientific instruments, medicines, furs for the winter, and gifts for the people. The trio departed by sled for Sweden, intending to go to London, where the Superior General had arranged for a ship to take them to Canton. Shortly after departing, Grassi and two others fell ill and were attended by a doctor for ten days in a small town on the Russian–Swedish border. They eventually reached Stockholm, Sweden, on 22 March 1805, where the Russian minister to Sweden informed them that the British would not permit them to sail from London. Therefore, the party instead went to Copenhagen, but discovered that there were no ships that could take them to Canton, and spent a month in Copenhagen waiting for the next ship to take them to London. The party reached London on 25 May, but found no ships that would take them to China. Lord George Macartney, the former British ambassador to China, failed to convince the directors of the East India Company to allow the Jesuits to travel on their vessels.

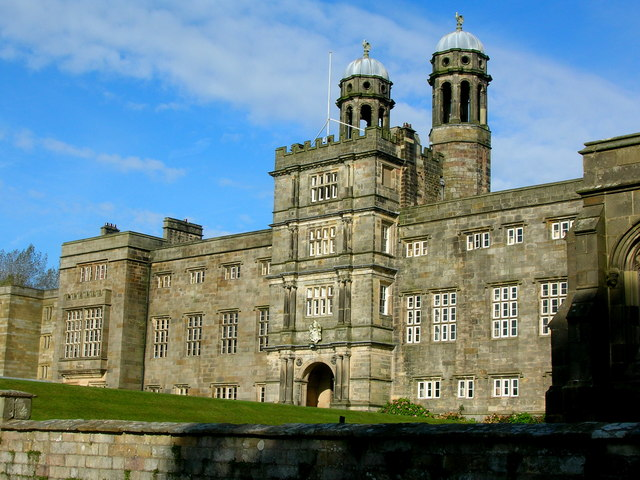
Grassi taught at Stonyhurst College for three years.

The party set sail for Lisbon, Portugal, where they hoped to secure passage to Macau. Their journey was delayed by a stop in Cork, Ireland, and they eventually arrived in Lisbon on 28 September 1805. The apostolic nuncio to Portugal informed them that due to the Portuguese persecution of the Jesuits under the Marquis of Pombal, they would not be permitted to board a Portuguese vessel without written approval from the pope. Meanwhile, Grassi studied astronomy under Count Damoiseau de Montfort. In March 1806, the three were informed that the Congregation de Propaganda Fide in Rome had become uneasy about their mission to China. Realizing that they would be in Portugal for considerably longer, the party began studying at the University of Coimbra for two months. Grassi also started tutoring the eldest son of Count Arcos in mathematics.

Due to an escalation of the persecution of Christians in China, the Superior General decided that he would no longer permit their mission. On 23 September 1807, he ordered them to go to Stonyhurst College in Lancashire, England, and await further instruction. Their vessel had to circumvent the French fleet invading Portugal, causing it to run out of food and almost run out of water. They finally reached Liverpool and then Stonyhurst College on 21 December 1807. At the college, Grassi taught Italian and Latin, while studying calculus and astronomy. He also studied mathematics and astronomy at the Royal Institution in London.

== American missionary ==
In 1810, Gruber's successor as Superior General, Tadeusz Brzozowski, ordered Grassi to go to the United States. Grassi set sail from Liverpool on 27 August, and landed in Baltimore, Maryland, on 20 October. He met with John Carroll, the Archbishop of Baltimore, and proceeded to Georgetown College in Washington, D.C. He found Baltimore "completely deserted," contrary to what a map of the city suggested; Washington was an even greater contrast to the cities of Europe he was used to, describing it as "not even one-eighth ...built up" and the Capitol unfinished. He also discovered the country was largely hostile to Catholics and especially wary of the Jesuits.

Grassi applied for American citizenship immediately upon arriving, and would become a naturalized citizen on 27 December 1815. When Grassi arrived at Georgetown, he found the college in a state of severe mismanagement. Its enrollment had dropped precipitously, tuition was prohibitively expensive, the size of the faculty was inadequate. The college was also operating on a significant financial deficit. In the preceding two decades, the school had had eight presidents, and there was a perennial debate about what the school's purpose should be. Bishop Carroll described Georgetown as having "sunk[en] to its lowest degree of discredit." In his first year, Grassi taught Italian and Spanish. On 12 August 1812, he attained the rank of gradus in the Society of Jesus, indicating that he had passed the examen ad gradum at the end of his Jesuit formation and had professed all four vows of the Jesuit order.

=== Presidency of Georgetown College ===
Grassi was appointed president of Georgetown College on 1 October 1812, succeeding Francis Neale. He was also appointed by the Superior General as the superior of the Jesuits' Maryland Mission, to succeed Charles Neale, Francis' brother. Due to the Napoleonic Wars, the letter of his appointment did not reach Washington until June, and he assumed office on 15 August. John Carroll informed Grassi that the Superior General did not have authority to appoint Grassi as president and rector, as Georgetown College was not owned by the Jesuit order itself but by the Corporation of Roman Catholic Clergymen; (Note: The Corporation of Roman Catholic Clergymen of Maryland was incorporated as a civil entity by the Maryland General Assembly in 1792 in response to the suppression of the Society of Jesus. Its purpose was to preserve the property of the former Jesuits with the hope that the Society would be one day restored and the property returned under the ecclesiastical jurisdiction of the Jesuit superior in America.) indeed, Grassi was the first president who had not been elected by the board of directors or appointed by Carroll. Nonetheless, Carroll did not oppose Grassi's assumption of leadership, and the board unanimously elected Grassi, but did not confer on him all the powers normally associated with the office. The following year, he went to St. Inigoes, Maryland, to complete his retreat before pronouncing his final vows, where he contracted a fever that lasted for a year.

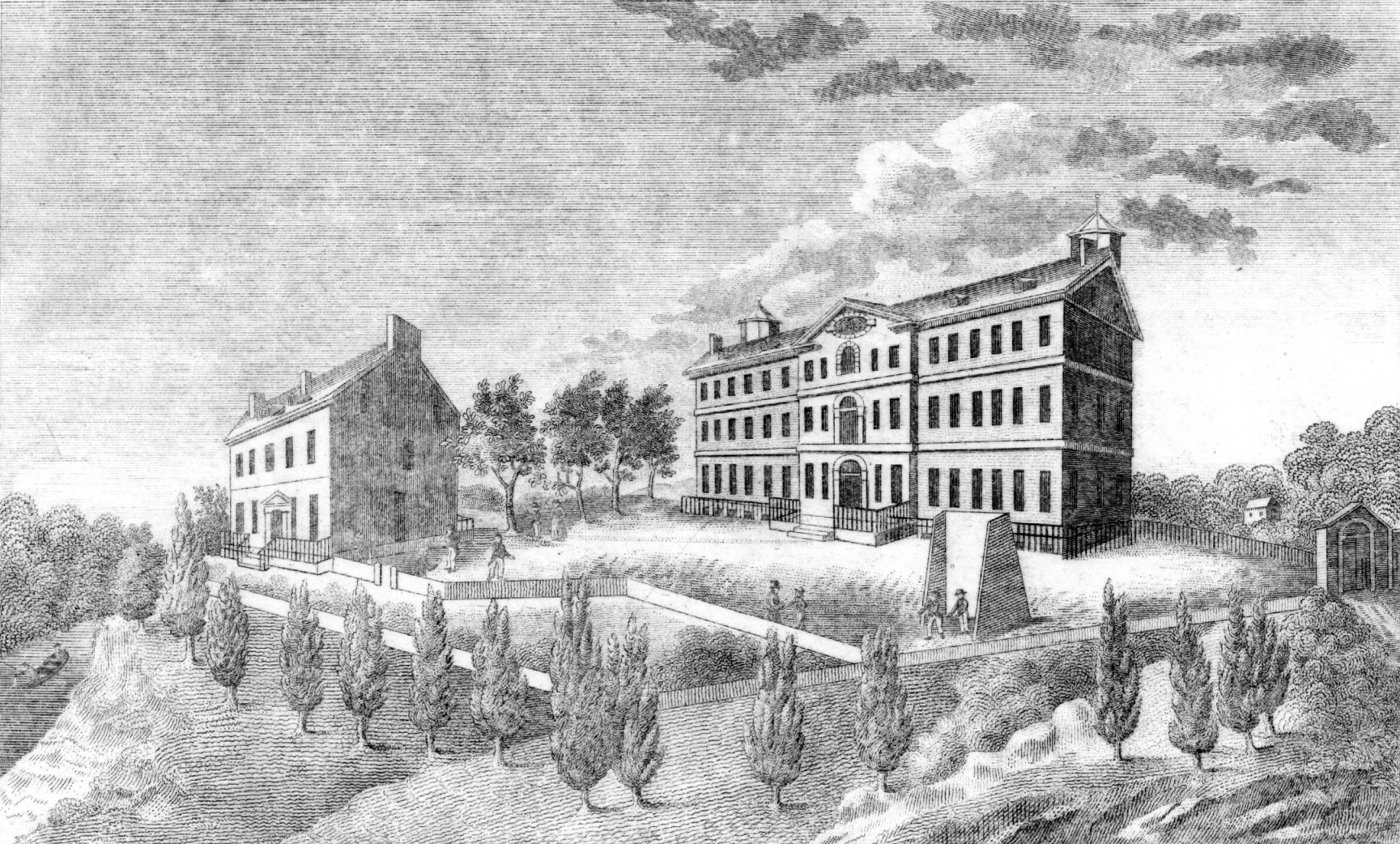
Georgetown College as it appeared during Grassi's presidency

When Grassi assumed office, Georgetown was struggling financially, with just 31 students enrolled, and Carroll was considering closing the school. Grassi immediately instituted a significant reform of the faculty and curriculum, hiring talented faculty and firing those who were inferior. He also improved discipline among the students. The number of subjects taught at the college increased, and the number of enrolled students increased four-fold. During his presidency, he continued to teach algebra, mensuration, and arithmetic. He also instructed students in astronomy, using instruments he had brought from Stonyhurst. Grassi made by his own hand or had a Jesuit brother make wooden orreries (since the college did not have money to purchase brass ones) for displaying the motion of the planets, as well as other apparatuses to demonstrate principles of mechanics or hydraulics. He also established a museum, that housed these devices, among other items; this museum drew members of the public, including U.S. senators and representatives. Upon request, Grassi used these instruments to calculate the longitude of Washington, D.C., (Note: At the time, many nations used their capitals as the prime meridian for their own maps. Worldwide calculation of longitude in relation to Greenwich was a later development.) and the timing of eclipses.

Grassi also oversaw Georgetown during the British burning of Washington in the War of 1812. He maintained good relations with the American political leaders and with the Russian ambassador to the United States, Andrey Yakovlevich Dashkov, who frequently visited the college. Though he opposed what he viewed as unbridled freedom in the United States, he approved that it was conducive to the free exercise of religion, which was banned by some of Europe's civil governments. He criticized slavery in the United States as being inconsistent with a national spirit of liberty, and considered it the country's greatest flaw, but wrote that the material conditions of some slaves were superior to those of Europe's peasantry, and regarded immediate, universal emancipation as too dangerous. He also wrote of how Black people were children of God and spoke positively of their faith. While he opposed slavery in the abstract, Grassi's appointment as superior of the Maryland Jesuits thrust him into a world in which slavery was accepted and quotidian. As superior, he was responsible for managing the slaves owned by the Maryland Jesuits.

After the pope restored the Society of Jesus in 1814, Grassi negotiated a concordat with Carroll's successor, Archbishop Leonard Neale (a brother of Charles and Francis) regarding the division of parishes in the United States between the Jesuits and the secular clergy. He took advantage of the enrollment of the sons of various members of Congress at Georgetown to obtain, through the assistance of William Gaston (a Georgetown alumnus and the only Catholic member of Congress), a congressional charter for Georgetown College on 1 March 1815, which raised the institution to university status.

In Archbishop Carroll's estimation, Grassi had "revived the College of G^{e}-Town, which [had] received great improvement in the number of students and course of studies." For this, Grassi has been described as Georgetown's "second founder". (Note: The original founder of Georgetown in 1789 was Bishop John Carroll. Patrick Francis Healy has also been described as the university's "second founder".) With this great number of students came an increase in the religious and ethnic diversity of students, including more Protestant, French and Irish students. Overall, this led to an increase in the public reputation of Georgetown. His presidency ended on 28 June 1817, and he was succeeded by Benedict Joseph Fenwick. His term as superior of the Maryland Mission also ended, where he was replaced by Anthony Kohlmann on 10 September.

== Return to Europe ==
=== Representative to the Propaganda Fide ===
In July 1817, Archbishop Neale sent Grassi to Rome to persuade the Congregation de Propaganda Fide to reverse a previous order to reinstate several priests in Charleston, South Carolina, whom Neale had removed from ministry. Grassi would remain in Europe for the rest of his life, despite the calls of Peter Kenney, the visitor to the United States on behalf of the Superior General, to return Grassi to Georgetown.

His removal from the United States was lamented by many of the church leaders, including one Bishop Benedict Joseph Flaget, who had proposed Grassi to become the Bishop of Detroit. Notwithstanding initial instructions to return to the United States, Grassi remained in Italy, as his physicians told him that he would not survive a voyage across the Atlantic due to a hernia. While in Rome, he successfully pleaded before the Propaganda Fide for the full canonical restoration of the Jesuit order in England.

=== Provincial superior and royal confessor ===
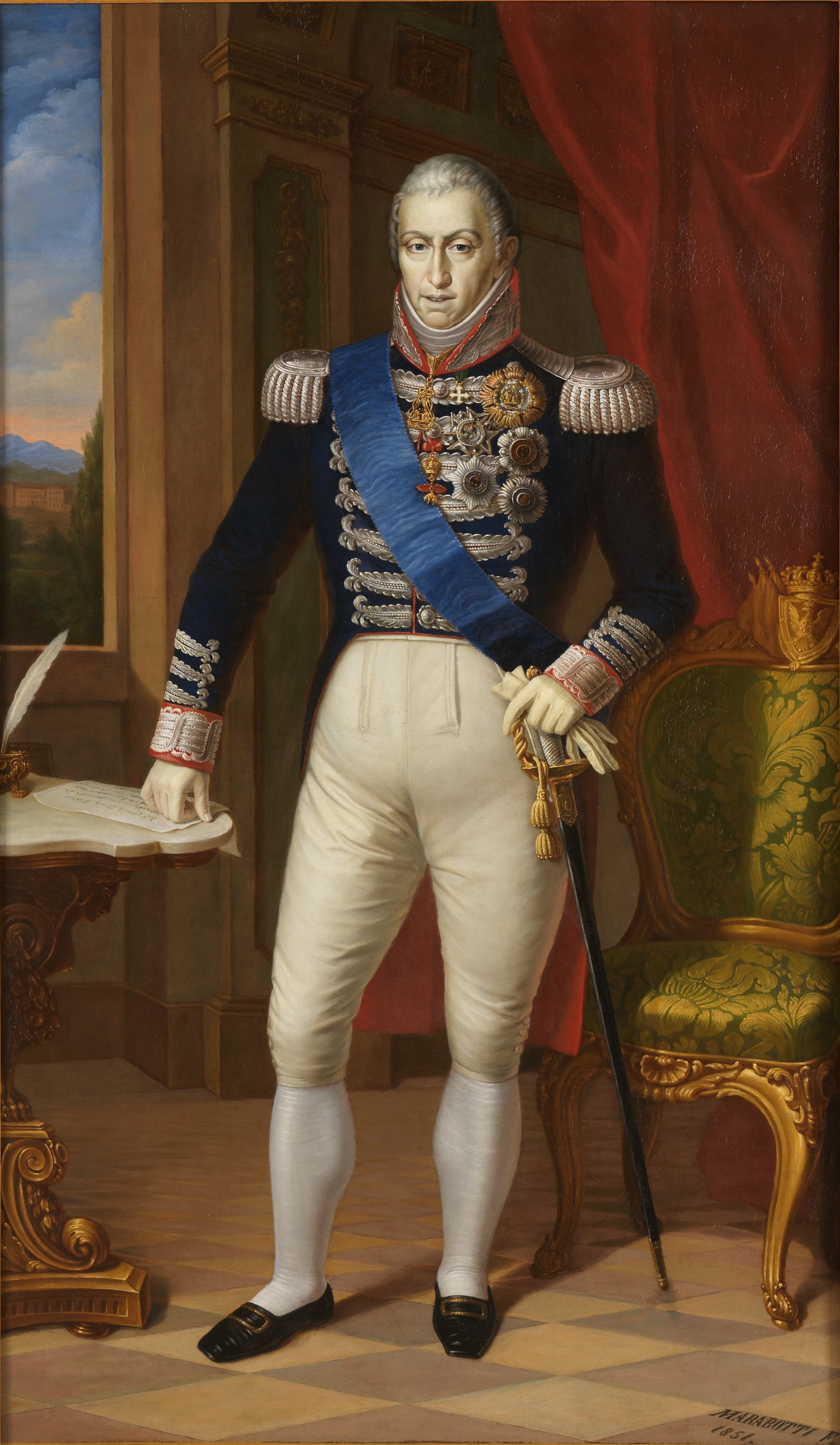
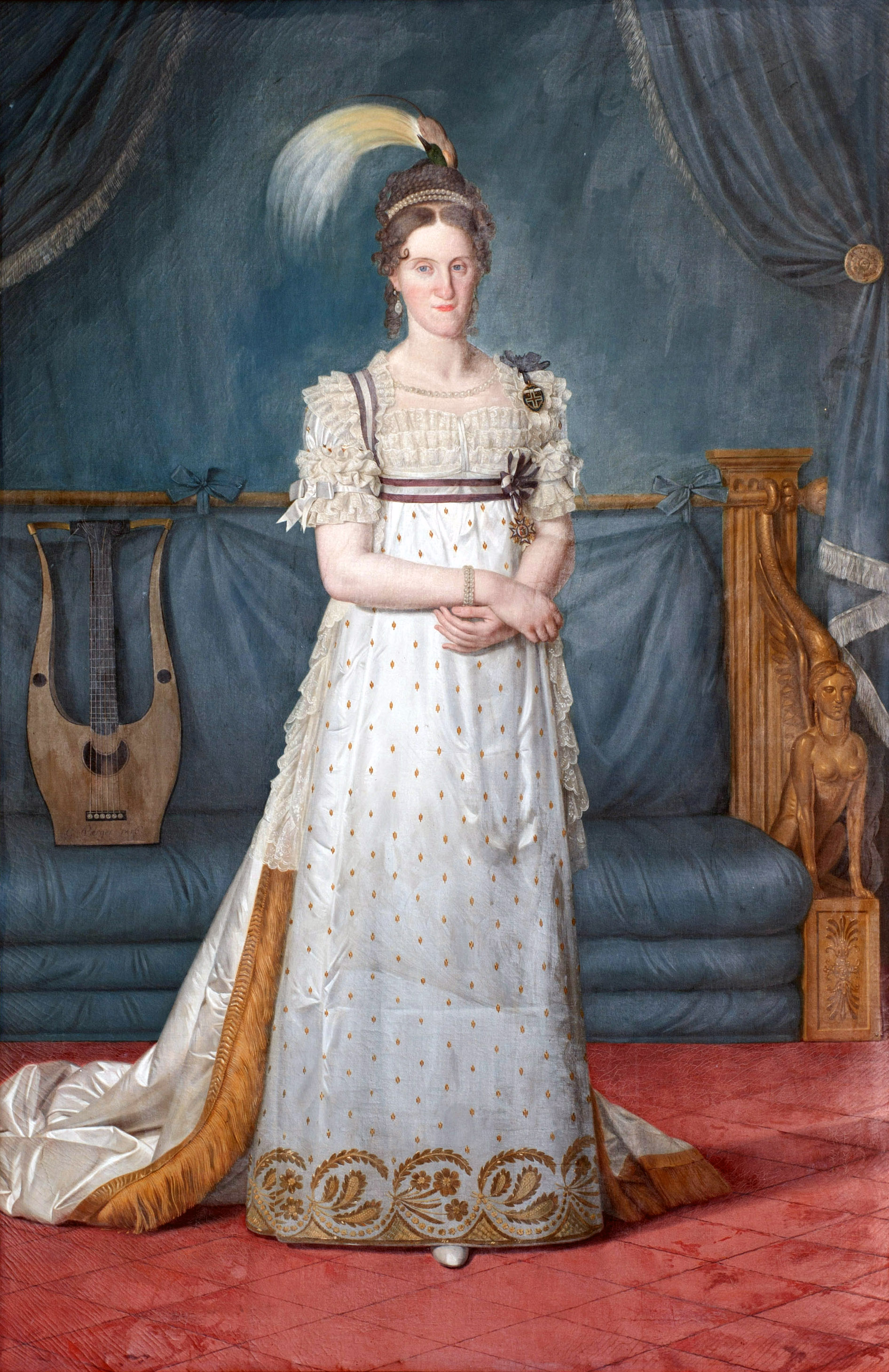
Grassi was a confidant of King Charles Felix and confessor to Queen Maria Cristina of Sardinia.

Grassi became the procurator (approximately equivalent to a treasurer) of the Jesuit province of Italy, as well as the socius (assistant) to the Jesuit provincial superior of Italy. On 17 November 1821, he became the rector of the College of Nobles in Turin, a position he held until 1831. During his rectorship, the school prospered and became the premier Jesuit boarding school on the Italian peninsula. While in Turin, he developed a relationship with the House of Savoy, and was appointed confessor to King Charles Felix and Queen Maria Cristina of Sardinia. As a result of his closeness with the royal family, King Charles Felix frequently sought Grassi's advice on several matters, and died in Grassi's arms.

In March 1821, Charles Felix's cousin, Charles Albert, had encouraged a revolt against Charles Felix's predecessor and brother, Victor Emmanuel I, that had forced Victor Emmanuel to abdicate. When Charles Felix ascended to the throne, he quashed the revolt. He later discovered the role that Charles Albert played in instigating the plot and intended to remove him from the line of succession. Grassi persuaded Charles Felix not to take this action against Charles Albert. In thanks, when Charles Albert succeeded Charles Felix, he pledged to protect the Jesuits in his kingdom; this promise would later be broken when Charles Albert expelled the order from the Kingdom of Sardinia.

On 10 May 1831, Grassi was appointed the first provincial superior of the newly created Jesuit Province of Turin as well as the rector of the College of the Holy Martyrs. During this time, he was permitted to continue serving as confessor to Maria Cristina, for a total of 25 years, even though it required that he reduce his duties as provincial. Eventually, he moved to Naples without first notifying the Superior General, and he became the rector of the San Sebastian boarding school. Grassi resumed his position at the College of the Holy Martyrs in 1832, but soon thereafter traveled with Maria Cristina to the Jesuit college in Chambéry.

Wanting him to choose a permanent residence, the Superior General recalled Grassi in 1835. He returned to Naples as the confessor to Princess Maria Vittoria of Savoy. He remained in the city to undertake charitable work during the cholera pandemic of 1836. In 1840, Grassi became the rector of the Pontificio Collegio Urbano de Propaganda Fide, replacing Liberio Figari. He held this position for two years, and was succeeded by Giovanni Batta Dessi. He then served as the assistant to the Superior General for Italy from 1842 to 1849, and was the archivist of the Jesuit generalate house in Rome. His transfer to Rome was made despite strong protests from Filiberto Avogadro di Collobiano, a Sardinian senator, on the grounds that it would be cruel to Maria Cristina. Grassi also assisted in writing the biography of Joseph Pignatelli, his former novice master, and testified in 1842 during his cause for beatification. By virtue of his American citizenship, he was permitted to remain in Rome—as well as even wear his cassock in public and teach classes—during the revolution of 1848 and under the government of the Roman Republic in 1849. Grassi died on 12 December 1849 in the house of Cardinal Angelo Mai in Rome.

== Notes ==
Academic offices
| Preceded by Francis Neale | 9th President of Georgetown College; 1812–1817 | Succeeded by Benedict Joseph Fenwick |
| Preceded by – | Rector of the Turin College of the Holy Martyrs; 1831–1835 | Succeeded by – |
| Preceded by Liberio Figari | 27th Rector of the Pontificio Collegio Urbano de Propaganda Fide; 1840–1842 | Succeeded by Giovanni Batta Dessi |
Catholic Church titles
| Preceded by Charles Neale | 23rd Superior of the Jesuit Maryland Mission; 1812–1817 | Succeeded by Anthony Kohlmann |
| New office | 1st Provincial Superior of the Jesuit Province of Turin; 1831–1835 | Succeeded by – |
