= Adam Krupski =

Jesuit, professor, Catholic priest

- Born: July 7, 1706; Vilnius, Grand Duchy of Lithuania
- Died: March 8, 1748 (aged 41); Novogrudok, Grand Duchy of Lithuania
- Citizenship: Grand Duchy of Lithuania
- Occupations: Jesuit priest, professor of philosophy
- Years active: 1723–1748
- Era: Enlightenment
- Organization: Catholic Church

Adam Krupski (Polish: Adam Krupski, Belarusian: Адам Крупскі; July 7, 1706 – March 8, 1748) was a professor of philosophy and Jesuit priest in the Grand Duchy of Lithuania. Legal expert in the legislation of the Grand Duchy of Lithuania, author of a school dialogue. His handwritten lectures on philosophy have survived. In his teaching activities, he adhered to the ideas of the Enlightenment.

== Biography ==
- July 14, 1723 – joined the Jesuit order in Vilnius.
- In 1736–1737 – Professor of rhetoric at the Jesuit College in Polotsk (Belarus).
- In 1737–1738 – Prefect of the school in Ilūkste (Latvia).
- In 1739–1740 – Professor of philosophy at the Jesuit College in Minsk (Belarus).
- In 1740–1742 – Professor of philosophy at the Jesuit College in Kražiai (Lithuania).
- In 1742–1746 – Procurator of the province of the Jesuit Order (Society of Jesus).
- In 1746–1748 – Professor of philosophy at the Jesuit College in Novogrudok (Belarus).

== Sources ==
- (Belarusian) Вялікае княства Літоўскае: Энцыклапедыя / рэд. кал.: Г. П. Пашкоў (галоўны рэд.), Т. У. Бялова і інш.; мастак З. Э. Герасімович. — 2-е выданне. — Мінск : Выд. «Беларуская Энцыклапедыя імя Пятруся Броўкі, 2005—2010. — Т. 1—3. — ISBN 978-985-11-0392-4.— С. 285, Т. 3.
- (Lithuanian) Plečkaitis Romanas, «Lietuvos filosofijos istorija: Viduramžiai — Renesansas — Naujieji amžiai», 1 tomas, Kultūros, Filosofijos ir Meno Institutas, Vilnius, 2004. ISBN 9986-638-50-X (ISBN 978-9986-638-50-6)
- (Polish) «Encyklopedia wiedzy o jezuitach na ziemiach Polski i Litwy 1564—1995», Oprac. Ludwik Grzebień i inni. — Kraków 2004. — S. 335.
- Poszakowski – s. 451
- Lit 65 f. 45 (nekr.)
- BUWiL 1229 (wyklady z filoz.)
