= Pontificio Collegio Urbano de Propaganda Fide =

Catholic university in Rome

- Established: 1 August 1627
- Founder: Pope Urban VIII
- Parent institution: Congregation for the Evangelization of Peoples
- Religious affiliation: Catholic Church
- Rector: don Armando Nugnes
- Location: Rome, Italy; 41°53′58.5″N 12°27′30.1″E
- Website: www.collegiourbano.org

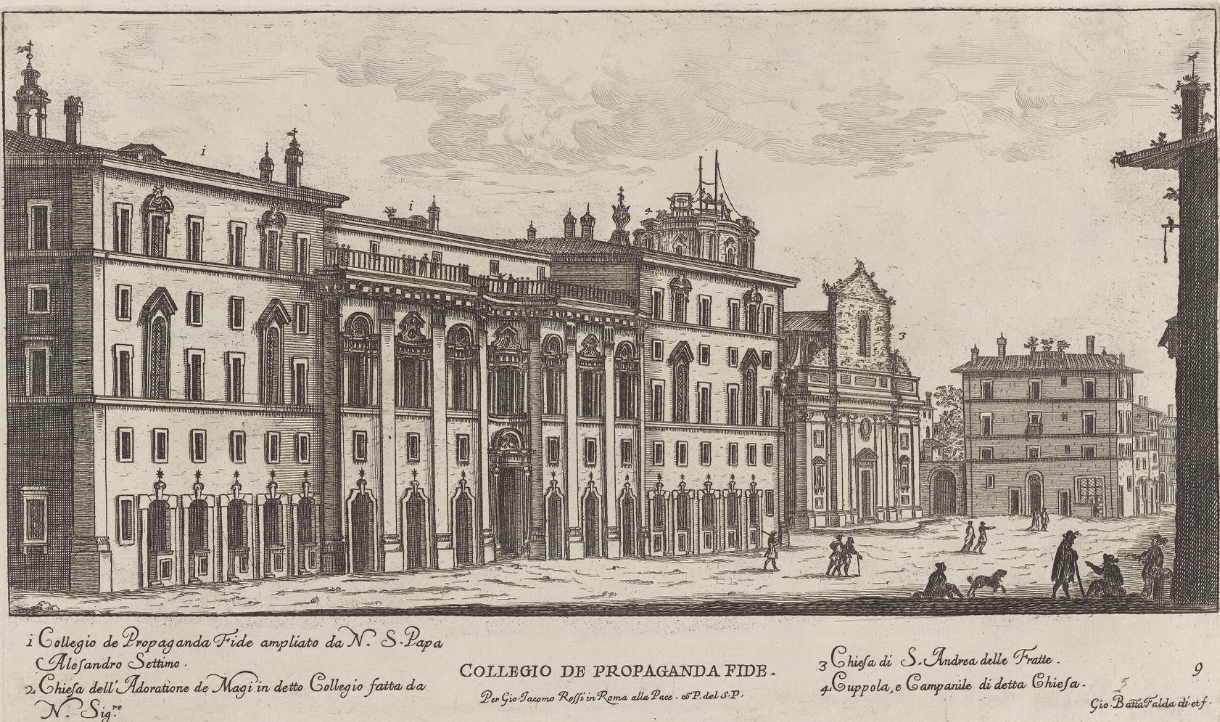
Collegio de Propaganda Fide by Giovanni Battista Falda (1665)

The Pontificio Collegio Urbano de Propaganda Fide (English: Pontifical Urban College for the Propagation of the Faith), also known as the Collegium Urbanum or Urban College, was a Catholic seminary established in 1627 for the purpose of training missionaries to spread the faith around the world. It is now known as the Pontifical Urban University.

== History ==
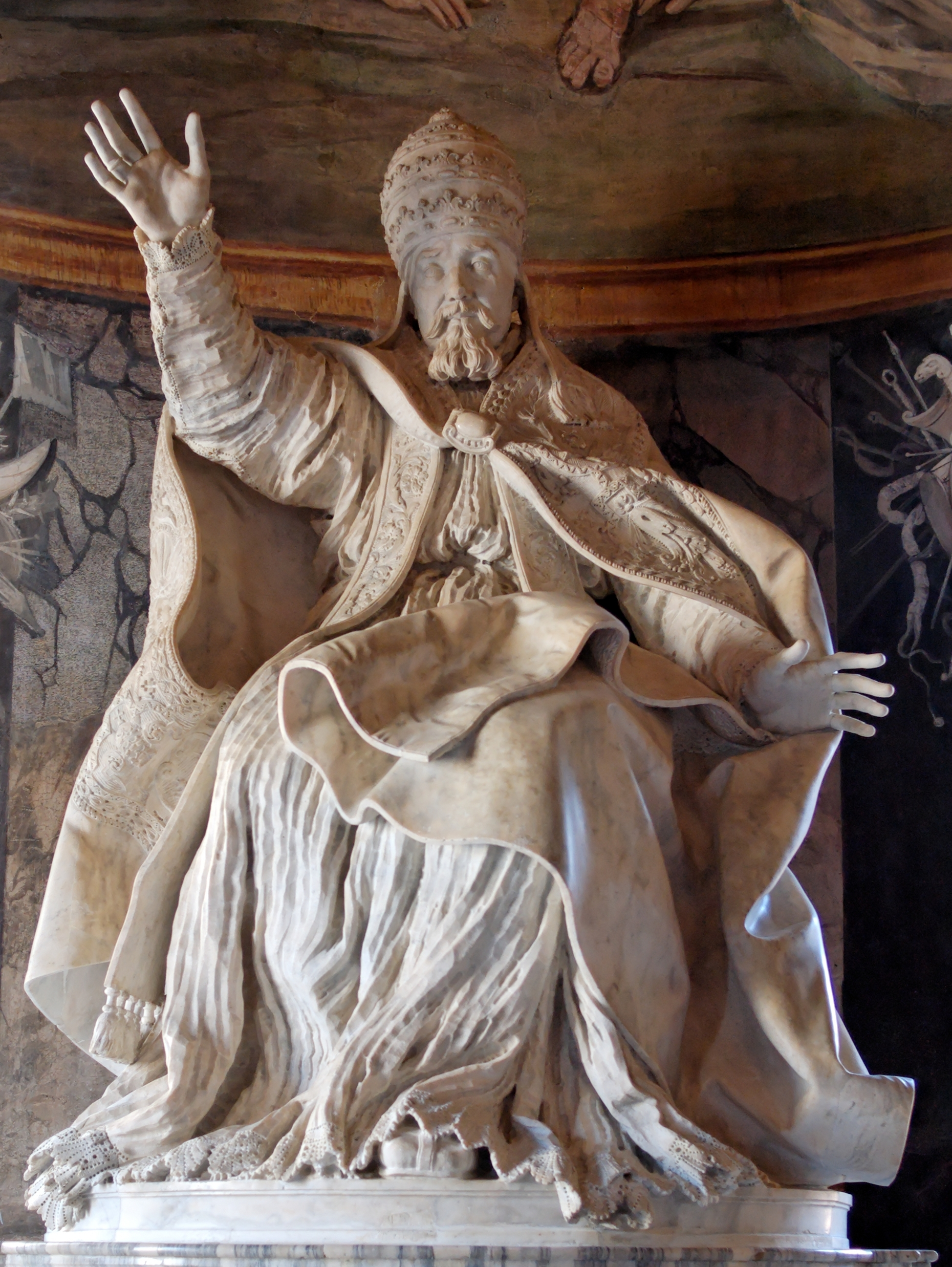
Statue of Pope Urban VIII by Bernini

The college was established in Rome by Pope Urban VIII. In a brief on January 27, 1624, he ordered the investment of money and the acquisition of the palazzo Ferratini in the Piazza di Spagna; by the Bull "Immortalis Dei Filius" on 1 August 1627, the college was established.

One of the greatest benefactors of the new college was Urban VIII's brother, Cardinal Antonio Barberini. In September 1633 he bought all the houses and gardens between the college building and the Church of Sant'Andrea delle Fratte. On May 5, 1634, he laid the foundation stone of the college church.

Italians were not admitted to the college, except from areas of missionary work - Valtellina and the diocese of Como. From the outset, students were drawn from the Balkans, Northern Europe and the Middle East. The college prepared them for taking holy orders, after which they were to return to their homelands as missionaries. Between 1633 and 1703 a total of 451 students attended the college. Of these, 48 were Armenian, 42 Dutch, 34 Dalmatian, 33 Greek, 25 Syrian, 25 Valtellinese, 22 German, 17 Indian, 10 Ethiopian, 8 Persian and one from New Spain. In the first half of the nineteenth century the college had as its spiritual director Saint Vincent Pallotti and among its students, at different times, were Saints Oliver Plunkett and John Henry Newman.

On 27 June 1641 a further Bull of Urban VIII abolished the college's autonomous administration and brought it directly under the Congregation for the Propagation of the Faith.

The effectiveness of the training was difficult to judge. In 1660 it became a requirement for all missionaries within Europe to send an annual letter back to the college - for those outside Europe, every other year sufficed. From these letters it can be ascertained that of the 51 seminarists between 1633 and 16&3, 27 had become missionaries, while the remaining 24 had died, abandoned their mission or simply disappeared.

In 1798, following the disruption surrounding the creation of the Roman Republic and the Napoleonic Wars, the college was closed and some of the students were received by the Lazarists at Montecitorio. This arrangement lasted until 1809, when even this last remnant of the college was suppressed. In 1814, however, some of the Propaganda students were again received by the Lazarists, and in 1817 the Urbaniana was reopened. From 1836 until 1848, it operated under the direction of the Jesuits.

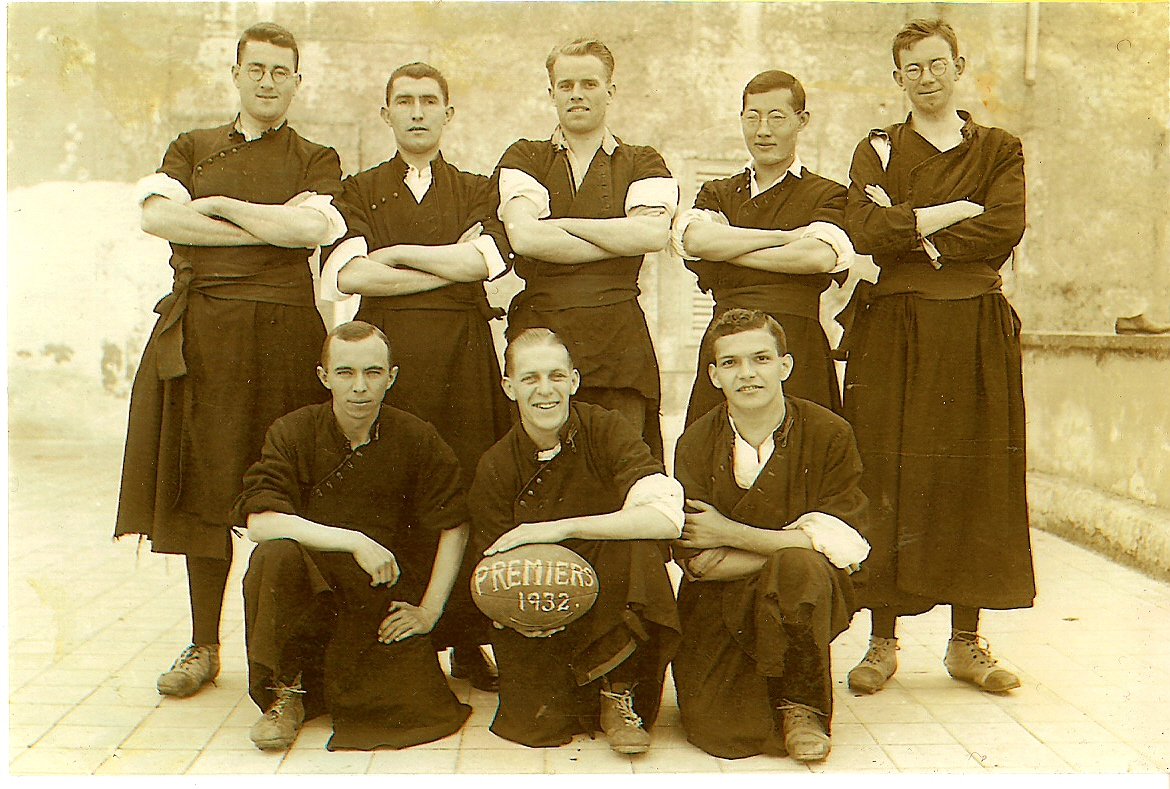
Students of the Collegio Urbano de Propaganda Fide in their house cassocks after a game. (A.D. 1932)

In 1925 the Cardinal Prefect, Willem Marinus van Rossum (1854–1932) purchased the hospital of Santa Maria della Pietà on the Gianicolo Hill, and the seminarians transferred to this site, their current residence, on 2 November 1926. In the meantime, Van Rossum also began the construction of the Pontifical Urban University. After the teaching functions moved to the new university, the college building has continued to serve as the residence for the seminarians, which was inaugurated by Pope Pius XI on 24 April 1931.

== Current arrangements ==
The Collegio Urbano comes under the direct authority of the Dicastery for Evangelization. The most recent change to the statutes of the college were made in 2001 by Cardinal Crescenzio Sepe. The new regulations were approved on 11 November 2006 by Cardinal Ivan Dias. At present the college has been led by don Armando Nugnes, of the diocese of Aversa.

As of 2022 the Collegio Urbano had 158 students from various parts of Asia and Africa; none of the seminarists are from Italy. To be admitted to the college, candidates must be recommended by a bishop and are required to have an understanding of Italian. The first stage of training for the priesthood lasts five or six years, during which the seminarists study philosophy and theology as well as languages. In some cases a period of licentiate lasting two or three years is required before ordination takes place.

== Alumni ==
- Germanos Adam, Melkite bishop and theologian
- Stefano P. Israelian, Armenian bishop and martyr
- Venerable Augustus Tolton (first openly African-American priest)
- William Augustine Williams (first openly African-American Catholic seminarian)
- Blessed Iuliu Hossu (1885-1870), Romanian Greek-Catholic bishop of Gherla and, later, of Cluj-Gherla, martyr of the communist persecution, first Romanian cardinal

== Rectors ==
The following is a chronological list of rectors of the college.

1. Giuseppe Matraia (1605–1610)
2. Juan Bautista Vives (1610–1632)
3. Sebastiano Pietroardi (1632–1637)
4. Domenico Cerroni (1637–1641)
5. Marco Romano (1641–1646)
6. Cosimo Riccardo Accolti (1646–1648)
7. Vincenzo Greco (1648–1650)
8. Sebastiano Panaceni (1651–1654)
9. Giuseppe Cruciani (1654–1655)
10. Annibale Saletti (1655–1658)
11. Michele Columera (1658–1662)
12. Andrea Bonvicini (1662–1696)
13. Giulio Cesare de Rossi (1696–1708)
14. Nicola Castelli (1708–1710)
15. Guido Della Porta (1710–1719)
16. Teodoro Moriconi (1719–1731)
17. Francesco Sosio Tramontana (1731–1744)
18. Domenico della Rocca (1744–December 1744)
19. Ildefonso Tarditi (December 1744 – 1771)
20. Paolo Lazzarini (1771–1776)
21. Bernardino Ficoroni (1776–1777)
22. Giovanni Battista Canonici (1777–1793)
23. Filippo Biagioli (1793–1818)
24. Raimondo Serdominici (1818–1830)
25. Carlo Augusto Conte di Reisac (1830–1836)
26. Liberio Figari (1836–1840)
27. Giovanni Antonio Grassi (1840–1842)
28. Giovanni Batta Dessi (1842–1844)
29. Maksymilian Stanisław Ryłło (1844–1846)
30. Antonio Bresciani (1846–1848)
31. Paolo Cullen (1848–1849)
32. Filippo Tancioni (1849–1869)
33. Loreto Iacovacci (1869–1872)
34. Gustavo Corrado (1872–1889)
35. Filippo M. Camassei (1889–1904)
36. Giovanni Bonzano (1904–1912)
37. Bartolomeo Cattaneo (1912–1917)
38. Paolo Giobbe (1917–1925)
39. Torquato Dini (1925–1934)
40. Pietro Parente (1934–1938)
41. Lorenzo Maria Balconi (1938–1939)
42. Domenico Brizi (1939–1945)
43. Carlo Cavallera (1945–1947)
44. Felice Cenci (1947–1970)
45. Pellegrino Ronchi (1970–1977)
46. Natalino Fumagalli (1977–1985)
47. Angelo Lazzarotto (1985–1990)
48. Carlo Tei (1990–1991)
49. Francesco Pavese (1991–2002)
50. Fidel Gonzales Fernandez (2002–2005)
51. Fernando Domingues (2005–2013)
52. Vincenzo Viva (2013–2021)
53. Armando Nugnes (2021–present)

== See also ==
- Francesco Ingoli
