= Education in Belarus =

Education in Belarus is free at all levels except for higher education. The government ministry that oversees the running of the school systems is the Ministry of Education of the Republic of Belarus. Each of the regions inside Belarus has oversight of the education system, and students may attend either a public (state) or a private school. The current structure of the educational system was established by decree in 1994. The education system is also based on The Education Code of the Republic of Belarus and other educational standards.

The Human Rights Measurement Initiative (HRMI) finds that Belarus is fulfilling 90.8% of what it should be fulfilling for the right to education based on the country's level of income. HRMI breaks down the right to education by looking at the rights to both primary education and secondary education. While taking into consideration Belarus' income level, the nation is achieving 85.2% of what should be possible based on its resources (income) for primary education and 96.3% for secondary education.

== Pre-school education ==
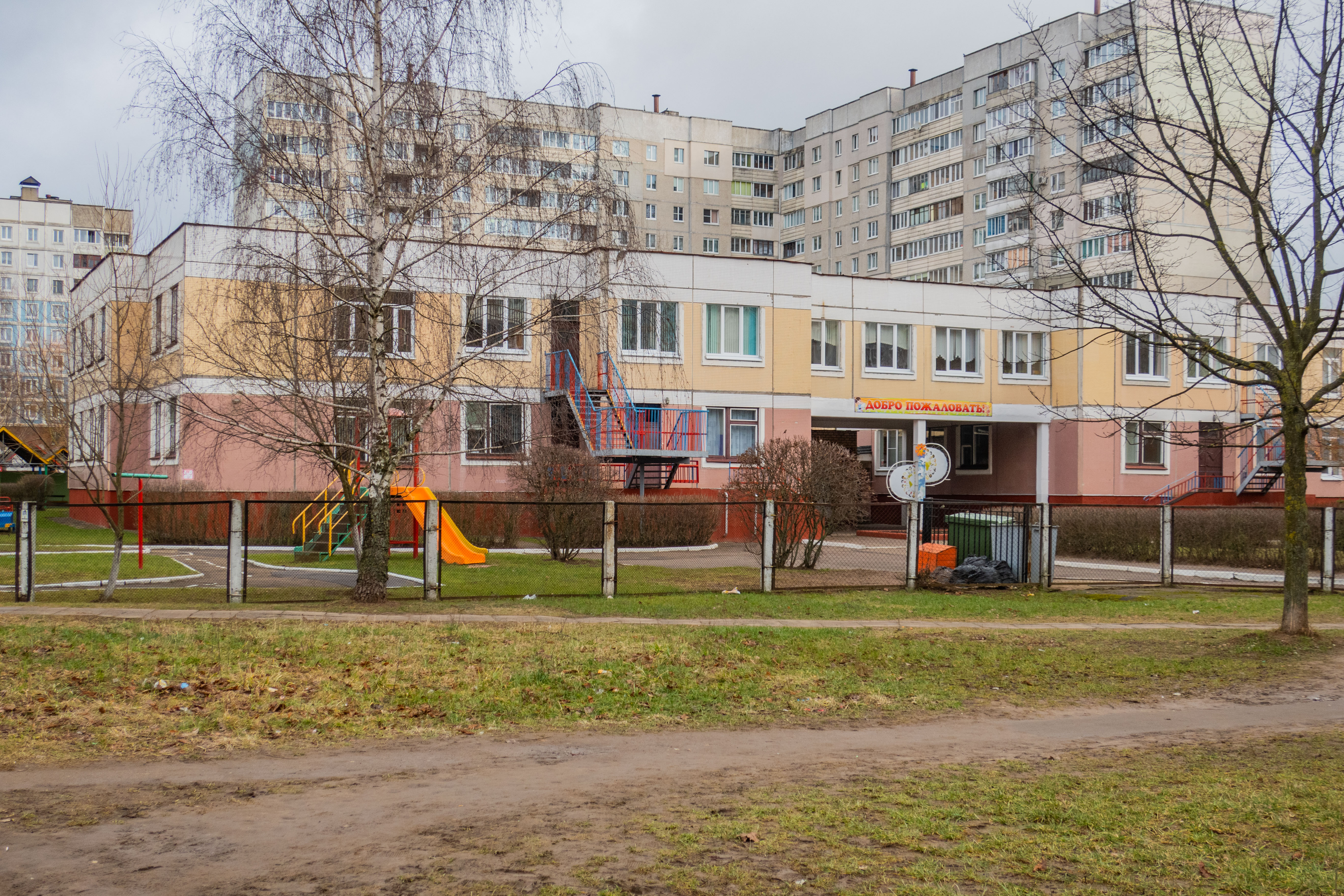
Kindergarten in Minsk

Pre-school education is not compulsory in Belarus, but around 70% of children attend kindergarten (at the ages of 3 to 5) before they start school. Nursery (at the ages 1 to 2) is also available but it's not as popular as kindergarten because maternity leave in Belarus lasts 3 years and many children stay at home till 3 years.

Some kindergartens are specialized to work with psycho-physically challenged children to help them socialize.

Very few kindergartens work in Belarusian language, and some parents experience difficulties trying to find a Belarusian-speaking kindergarten.

== Primary and secondary education ==
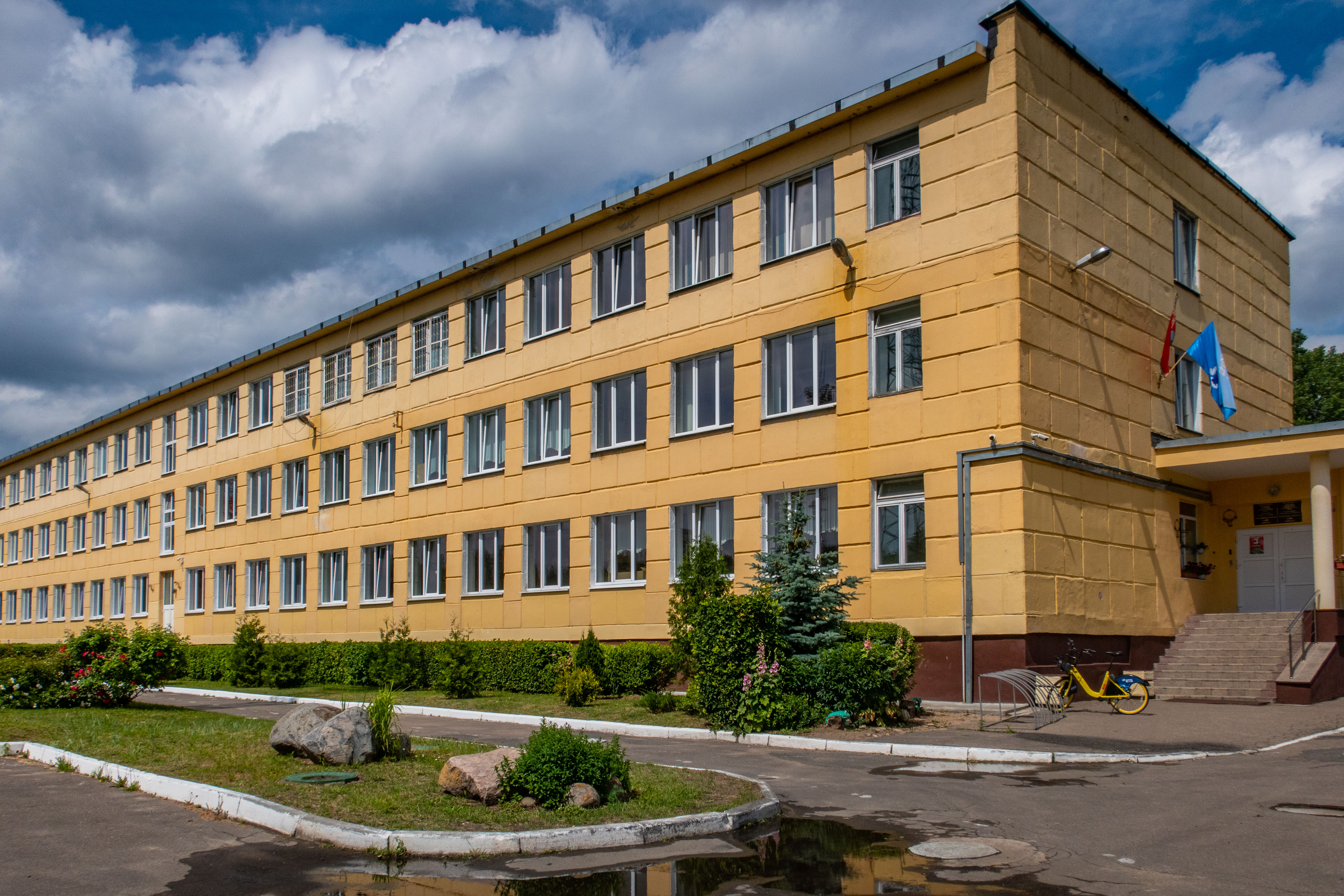
School No. 86 in Minsk

Education in primary and secondary schools is required for children from the ages of six until fifteen and lasts for 9 years. After finishing basic education, each student must pass the basic educational curriculum and is given a certificate by the state. Then students are able to enter a professional technical institutions where they can focus on completing their high school education and study to get a professional certificate.

Completion of 11 years of school or a professional certificate allows students to enter higher educational establishments or enter professional technical institutions as well; the length of the schooling depends on what the student has chosen.

The majority of children are educated in Russian language, some regions have no schools working in Belarusian language.

Belarusian schools use administrative resource to drag the pupils into the state-controlled BRSM youth union.

== Higher education ==
Higher education has been in constant growth since 1991. In 2011, 4,725 per 10,000 citizens were undergraduates. Belarus has also adopted the ECTS system, allowing more student mobility. Belarus counts 55 higher education institutions (45 state-owned, 10 private).

To enter a higher educational establishment a student must pass three centralized tests (and get up to 100 points per test).

There are two leading establishments of higher education in the national education system:

- Academy of Public Administration under the aegis of the President of the Republic of Belarus
- Belarusian State University
- Belarusian State University of Informatics and Radioelectronics

In 2020–2021, several teachers were fired for political reasons from universities. Ethnologist Uladzimir Lobač claimed that he was fired after Natalya Kochanova and Igor Marzalyuk threatened the Polack State University not to certify it.

A number of students who participated in the protests or openly expressed their civil position were expelled. A number of expelled students were forced to leave the country

== Marks ==
A ten-point grading scale has been used since 2002. It is used in primary, secondary and higher education.

The grading scale is divided into five levels:

Level	Grade	Russian equivalent
High	10	5+
High	9	5
Good	8	5-
Good	7	4+
Average	6	4
Average	5	4-
Satisfactory	4	3+
Satisfactory	3	3
Low	2	3-
Low	1	2
Low	0	1

Marks "1" and "2" are considered as "Fail" at school. In higher education, "3" is also considered as "Fail".

== Bologna process ==
Belarus has been a member of Bologna Process since May 2015.
