= Genrikh Abaev =

Azerbaijani professor and engineer

- Born: 2 November 1932; Baku
- Died: 7 September 2014 (aged 81)
- Education: Moscow State University
- Awards: "For Valiant Labour" Medal (2004), Jubilee Medal "In Commemoration of the 100th Anniversary of the Birth of Vladimir Ilyich Lenin" (1970), Medal "Veteran of Labour", "Exhibition of Achievements of National Economy" Medals, "Socialist Emulation Winner" Badge, "The Ministry of Oil and Gas Industry of the USSR Winner" Badge, "Honoured Inventor of the USSR" Badge
- Scientific career
- Fields: Biotechnology, Chemical engineering

Genrikh Nikolaevich Abaev (2 November 1932 – 7 September 2014) was a professor. He served as Head of the Department of Chemical Engineering at Polotsk State University, Belarus from 1988 to 2007.

== Early life and education ==
Abaev was born on 2 November 1932, in Baku, which was then part of the Azerbaijani SSR in the Soviet Union. Having finished his secondary education in Baku, he entered Azerbaijan State Oil and Industrial University (now Azerbaijan State Oil Academy).

Later he continued his career working as a professor at the following institutes: Azerbaijan Oil Refining Scientific Research Institute, All-Union Scientific Research Institute of Polefins (Baku), Scientific Research Institute (Yaroslavl), All-Union Scientific Research Institute of Polymers (Dzerzhinsk, Gorky Oblast), Bioengineering Research Institute of the Russian Federation (Moscow). Abaev defended his Doctoral thesis in 1971. The same year he was elected a specialty committee member of Higher Attestation Commission of the USSR.

Further inventions of Genrikh Abaev were implemented in the procedures such as: butyl rubber synthesis technology process, paraffin C4-C5 two-stage dehydrogenation, isobutylene hydration process based on molded cation exchange resin.

Abaev had received numerous awards and honours for his investigation of new manufacture technologies.

== Career ==
Abaev's scientific work was mostly connected with the chemical engineering and biotechnological modeling (fluidized bed and pneumatic conveying, propylene oxidative ammonolysis, butyl rubber jet aeration, acrylic fiber synthesis, oil distillation, fermentation).

In fact, there were 3 Doctoral and 19 PhD theses in Engineering Sciences defended under Abaev's supervision. It was Abaev's credit, that the new courses appeared at the Belarusian higher education institutes. The advanced courses were "Modeling and Design of Chemical Engineering Processes" and "Energy and Resource Conservation".

In 1997, he organized the Interdisciplinary Science Conference on Technology "Energy and Resource Conservation" (The Regional Energy Commission) at Polotsk State University.

Abaev was the founder and the chairman of The Academic Board for Doctor's thesis defense in Engineering Sciences in 1993. By the 2000, under his initiative the international contract with the French company ISL was made. The goal of that project was to develop a rapid analysis tool for oil. Later, the patent for that specific tool was obtained. Nowadays the tool is sold in 13 countries all over the world. Moreover, since 2002 Polotsk State University has been receiving quarterly cash awards from the invented tool sales.

== Publications ==
Abaev published over 300 articles. Selected academic works:

- Abaev, G.N; Beskov V.S. (1980). Aerodynamics of fixed granular-bed reactors. Chemical Industry. 11: 673–675
- Abaev, G.N; Dimudu, I.A; Zharkova O.N; Spiridonov A.V. (1995). "Computational methods in chemical engineering". Chemical Industry. 1: 29–34
- Abaev, G.N; Kapitonova, M.L; Mutalibova, M.R. (1992). "Calculation of ejection coefficient of vertical free aerated jets". Theoretical basics of chemical engineering. Vol.26: 152–158
- Abaev, G.N; Chernyavskaya, E.V. (2000). "Regularities of hydrodynamics and mass transfer in jet apparatuses". Journal of Engineering Physics and Thermophysics, Vol. 74, No. 3: 184–188
- Piskun, I.M; Abaev, G.N. (2010). "Heat pump with working body: Mixture of steam and air". Chemical Industry. 4: 194–203
- Abaev, G.N; Andreeva, R.A; Elshina, I.A. (2011). "Kinetics and Simulation in Implementation and Enhancement of Energy Efficiency of Biogas Plants". Chemical Industry. 5: 245–249
- Abaev, G.N; Dubrovskii, A.V; Kushnir, E.V. (2013). "A comparison of automatic instruments for oil-product fractional composition determination". Industrial Service. 3: 15–21

== Inventions ==
- Abaev, G.N; Arapov, V.V; Klyuev, A.V; Spiridonov, G.N. A method of automatic instruments for oil-product fractional composition determination. 199980801, filled August 26, 1998, and filled March 30, 2000
- Abaev, G.N; Andreeva, G.N; Kolesnik, V; Spiridonov A.V; Urvantsev, V.V. Computer complex for modeling fractional oil distillation. Fr. Pat., 0013270, filled October 17, 2000, and issued April 19, 2002.
- Abaev, G.N; Kaminsky, K.I; Machulsky, I.A; Yarmolic, O.S. Methods for acrylonitrile and methylacrylate copolymerization processing. Belarus Pat., 5951, filled June 5, 1998, and issued March 30, 2014
- Abaev, G.N; Piskun, I.M. Heat pump with working body: Mixture of steam and air. Belarus Pat., 16833, filled December 11, 2012, and issued February 28, 2013
