= Jesuit College in Polotsk =

College in Polotsk, Grand Duchy of Lithuania

Coordinates: 55°29′10″N 28°45′51″E

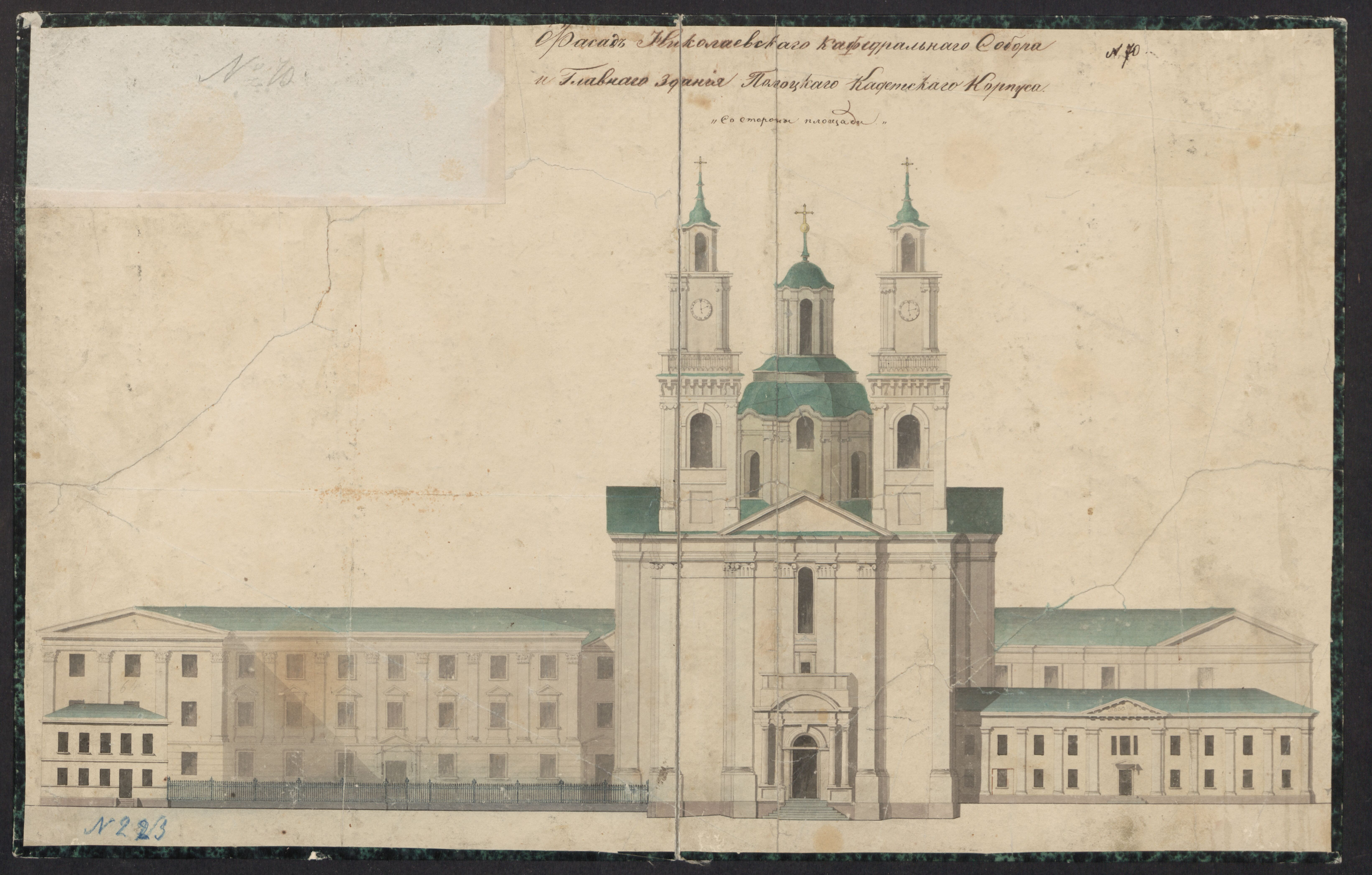
Jesuit College in Polotsk

The Jesuit College in Polotsk (Latin: Collegium Polocense) was a college established by the Jesuit Order in Polotsk, then part of the Grand Duchy of Lithuania and later occupied by the Russian Empire, and now in Belarus. It was established in 1580 and continued to function until 1820 when Jesuits were banished from the Russian Empire.

== History ==
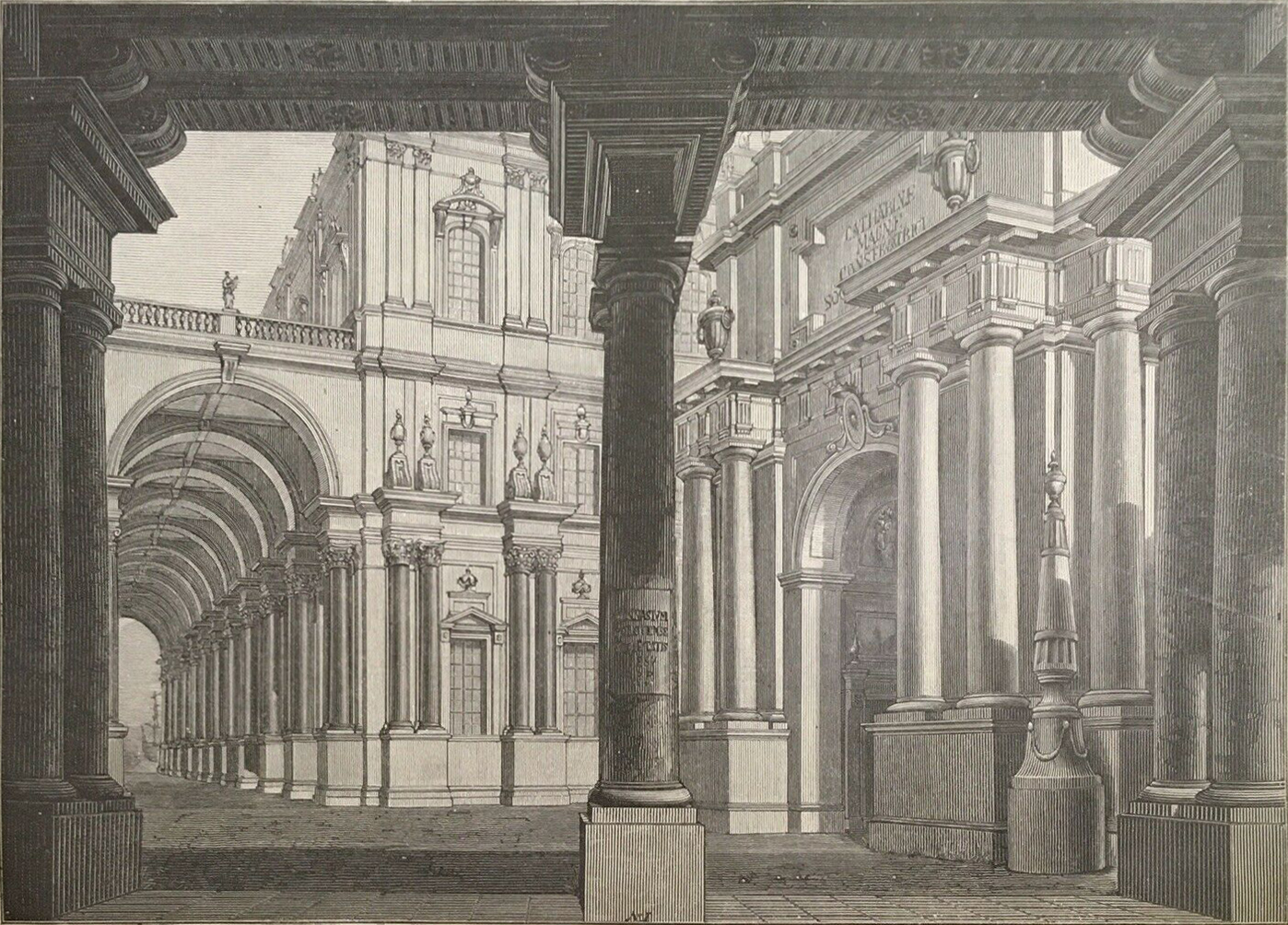
Entrance to the college in 1800.

Polish King Stephen Báthory captured Polotsk in 1579 during the Livonian War and invited Jesuits to the city in hopes to lessen the influence of the Eastern Orthodox Church. The Jesuits established a college (equivalent to a secondary school), modeled after the Jesuit Academy in Vilnius, in 1580. Its first rector was Piotr Skarga. A faculty of philosophy was added in 1649 and a faculty of theology in 1737.

After the first partition of the Polish–Lithuanian Commonwealth in 1772, Polotsk became part of the Russian Empire. That saved the college from the suppression of the Jesuits as Russian Empress Catherine the Great did not follow papal decrees. After lobbying by Joseph de Maistre, the college was elevated to an academy (equivalent to a university) in 1812 by Tsar Alexander I of Russia only to be closed eight years later when Alexander I banished the Jesuits from the Russian Empire and closed their schools. Academy's library, which held up to 60,000 volumes, was dispersed among various institutions in Eastern Europe.

The Polotsk State University and the Pontifical Faculty of Theology in Warsaw, established in 1998, both claim historical heritage of the Polotsk College. In 2005, former buildings of the college were partially reconstructed and transferred to the Polotsk State University.

== Notable faculty ==
- Very Rev. Franciszek Kareu
- Gabriel Gruber
- Stanislaus Czerniewicz
- Gabriel Lenkiewicz
- Adam Krupski

== Notable alumni ==
- Stanisław Czerski, priest, graphic artist, translator
- Giovanni Antonio Grassi, academic administrator and president of Georgetown College
- Jan Roothaan, Jesuit Superior General
- Maksymilian Stanisław Ryłło, missionary
- Fyodor Petrovich Tolstoy, artist
- Walenty Wańkowicz, painter

== See also ==
- History of the Polish–Lithuanian Commonwealth (1569–1648)
- History of the Polish–Lithuanian Commonwealth (1648–1764)
- History of the Polish–Lithuanian Commonwealth (1764–1795)
- List of Jesuit sites
