= Maksymilian Stanisław Ryłło =

Polish Catholic missionary (1802–1848)

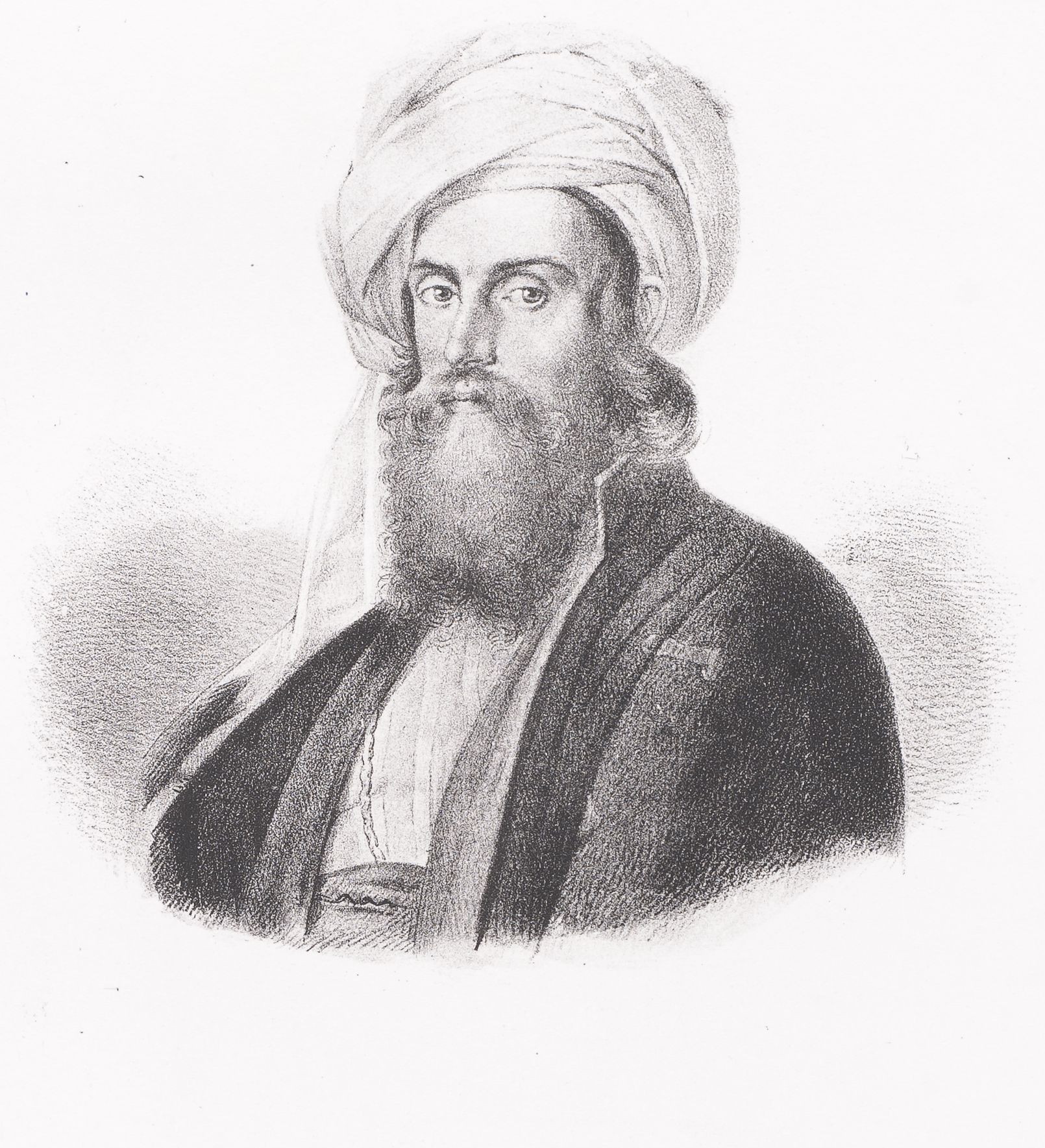
- Posthumous illustration of Ryłło in a journal published in 1894
- Born: 31 December 1802; Podorosk, Grodno Governorate, Russian Empire
- Died: 17 June 1848 (aged 45); Khartoum, Sudan
- Resting place: Cairo, Egypt
- Education: Jesuit College in Polotsk; Vilnius University; Roman College
- Occupations: Missionary, rector
- Years active: 1822–1848

Maksymilian Stanisław Ryłło (31 December 1802 – 17 June 1848) was a Polish Catholic missionary and a member of the Jesuit order. He is known for his missions to Middle East, where he founded the Saint Joseph University of Beirut, and his preaching ability. Ryłło was also the rector of the Pontificio Collegio Urbano de Propaganda Fide from 1844 to 1846.

== Early life ==
Maksymilian Stanisław Ryłło was born on 31 December 1802 in Podorosk, in present-day Grodno Region, Belarus, (then a part of the Russian Empire) to a poor noble family. He studied at the Jesuit College in Polotsk from 1817 and received a master's degree in philosophy. Ryłło then studied medicine at Vilnius University.

== Career ==
Ryłło left the university in spring 1820 with a group of Jesuits as they had been expelled from the country and he was a candidate for the order. They traveled to Rome, reaching the city on 15 August. Ryłło became a member of the Jesuits on 9 September. He completed his novitiate in two years, at Sant'Andrea al Quirinale, then studied rhetoric for a year to teach grammar in the city of Orvieto from 1823 to 1824. From 1824 to 1826, Ryłło studied philosophy at the Roman College and then taught poetry in Navarre. While teaching at Navarre, he additionally tutored convicts and poets in Turin until 1830. From 1830 to 1834, he went back to the Roman College and studied theology, also preaching in the Roman squares. Ryłło was ordained as a priest on 29 December 1833.

Ryłło studied monastic law at Sant'Eusebio from 1834 to 1835. He replaced a sick professor of philosophy at the Roman College and became well known for his sermons. Ryłło originally wanted to do some pastoral work in Lithuania, but the November Uprising complicated his plans. Instead, he decided to focus on missions to the Middle East, helping to pay for a Jesuit mission to Syria in 1831. Ryłło left Rome with Paweł Riccadonna on 26 June 1836 to go to Lebanon and see if it was possible to open a Catholic academy there. He used the alias Piotr Rolly during the journey. Ryłło later visited Asia Minor as a papal visitor and passed by Damascus and the Tigris and Euphrates rivers. He made contracts with representatives of the Eastern Catholic Churches and researched the archaeology of sites there.

Ryłło returned from the Middle East in late 1837 and briefed Pope Gregory XVI on his plans to build a college in Beirut or Aleppo. He also donated artifacts he uncovered from Nineveh to the Vatican Museums. Ryłło stayed in the Vatican for a year, preparing for another journey east. There, he supported the formation of the Polish Resurrectionist Congregation. He left for Constantinople on 3 June 1839, taking care of Poles he met and preaching in Italian and French. Ryłło then traveled to Beirut and became the superior for the Jesuit mission in Syria. Ongoing wars around the area made it difficult to start establishing a college, but Ryłło was able to present a plan by March 1840. The college was built and partially opened in November 1841 and was called the College for Asia, before being renamed to the Saint Joseph University of Beirut in 1875. As Ryłło favored the Ottoman Empire during the Second Egyptian–Ottoman War and opposed the French-allied Egypt, the college was not state-funded and Ryłło had to be recalled to Malta in July 1841 due to France's protests against the Congregation for the Evangelization of Peoples.

Ryłło stayed in Malta from 23 October 1841 to 1 September 1843. He mainly preached, but also created another boarding school at the Church of St James, Valletta. The non-Catholics in Malta were very hostile to him and banned Ryłło from preaching on 3 March 1842. He could not preach again until 26 May 1843 when he was cleared of all charges. While Ryłło was unable to preach, he wrote about the book Spiritual Exercises by Ignatius of Loyola and did pastoral work. He was transferred to Sicily from September 1843 to June 1844, holding over 360 sermons and reaching fame from his preaching there. Ryłło was appointed the rector of the Pontificio Collegio Urbano de Propaganda Fide on 4 August 1844 and rented the Villa Madama as a place to take care of young missionaries.

Ryłło joined the Apostolic Vicarate of Central Africa (now the Roman Catholic Archdiocese of Khartoum) in December 1845 due to his knowledge of the east and the Arabic language. He resigned as the rector of the Pontificio Collegio Urbano and want to Beirut again in October 1846. Ryłło brought the Sisters of St Joseph of the Sacred Heart with him to teach girls at the College for Asia. He also acquired manuscripts for the Vatican Library. Ryłło reached Alexandria on 16 April 1847 and was appointed the director of a mission throughout Egypt on 22 April.

== Death ==
Ryłło set off on another expedition in July 1847, up the Nile to Cairo. He became very sick with dysentery during the trip but did not want to postpone it and continued to travel by raft and camel. Ryłło reached Khartoum on 11 February 1848 and bought a small house with a garden. He died in Khartoum on 17 June 1848. Ryłło's remains were originally buried in a local cemetery there, but they were later transferred to a religious tomb in Cairo in 1900.
