= Social Institute, Turin =

Information
- Former name: Holy Martyrs and College of Nobles
- Type: Private primary and secondary school
- Religious affiliation: Catholicism
- Denomination: Jesuits
- Established: 1881; 145 years ago
- Administrator: Carlo M. V. Denora
- Director: Cristina Bianco
- Grades: K through secondary
- Gender: Coeducational
- Enrollment: 800
- Website: istitutosociale.it

Social Institute, Turin, is a private Catholic primary and secondary school, located in Turin, Italy. The school was established by the Jesuits in 1881, and has over 800 pupils from kindergarten through to secondary school.

== History ==
In 1679, the Jesuits had opened College of Nobles in Turin. The building was designed by Guarino Guarini, who conceived a building with three equally ornate levels. Today this building houses Museo Egizio.

Currently the Jesuit Education Foundation oversees this among six Italian colleges and one in Albania.

== Notable alumni ==
- Giovanni Conso - jurist
- Piero Fassino - politician
- Giovanni Maria Flick - jurist
- Pier Giorgio Frassati - blessed social activist
- Ludovico Geymonat - philosopher
- Federico Lombardi - priest
- Carlo Maria Martini - cardinal
- Neja - singer
- Cesare Pavese - poet
- Mario Soldati - film director

== See also ==
- Education in Turin
- List of schools in Italy
- List of Jesuit schools
