= Saint Euphrosyne Polotsk State University =

Belarusian University

- Полацкі дзяржаўны ўніверсітэт імя Ефрасінні Полацкай
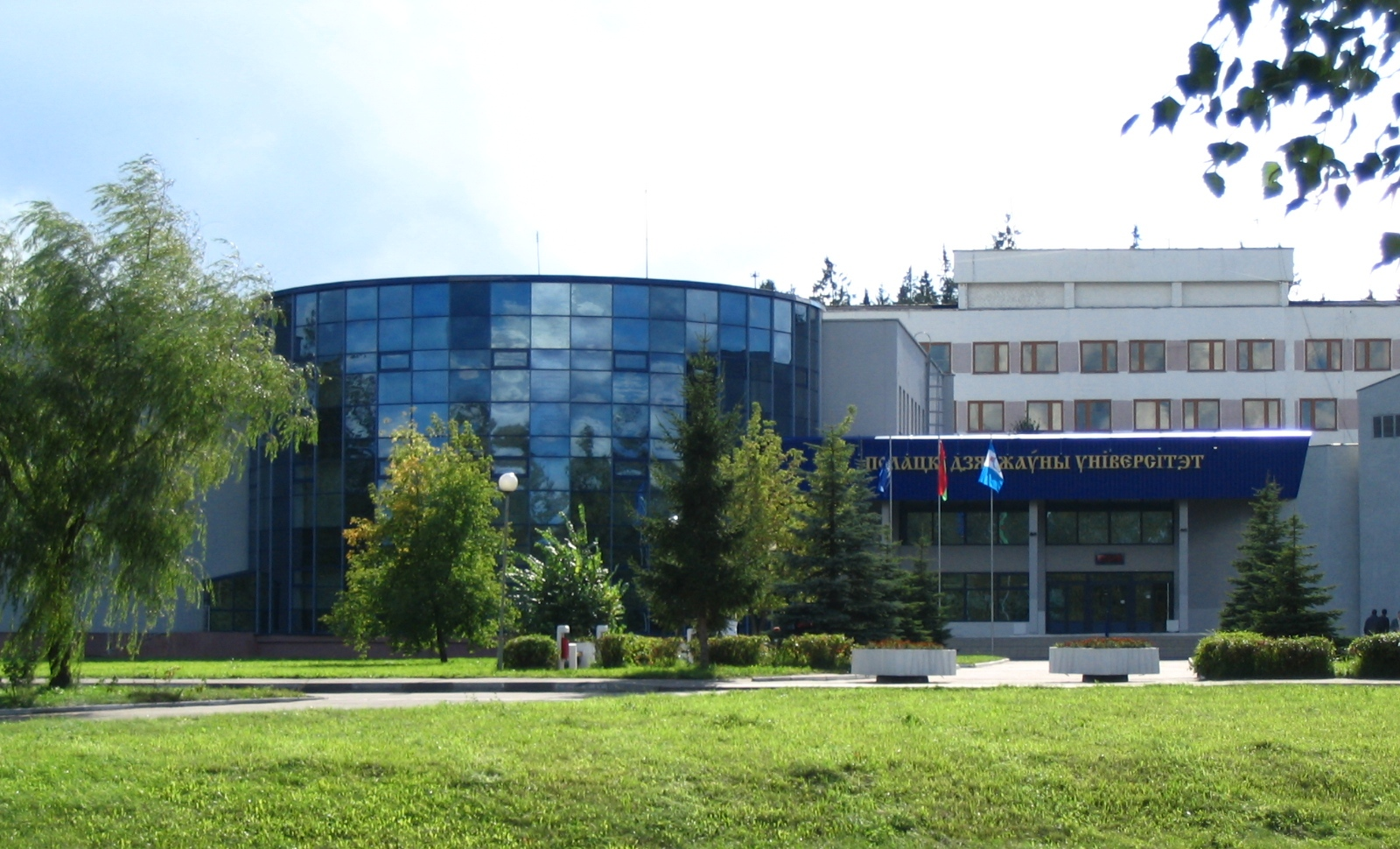
- Former names: Branch of Belarusian Technological Institute, Novopolotsk Polytechnical Institute named after Leninist Young Communist League of Belarus
- Motto: Docendo discimus (Latin for "We learn by teaching")
- Type: Public
- Established: 1968; 58 years ago
- Rector: Dr. Yury Ramanouski
- Administrative staff: 500
- Students: 10,500 (2016)
- Undergraduates: 45 study programs for Bachelor's Degree, 22 study programs for Academic Master Studies, 3 Master Programs of Double Diploma and 8 Practically Oriented Master Programs
- Postgraduates: 20 study programs
- Location: 29 Blokhin Street, 211440, Vitebsk Oblast, Novopolotsk, Belarus; 55°31′43″N 28°38′48″E
- Website: www.psu.by

Saint Euphrosyne Polotsk State University (Belarusian: Полацкі дзяржаўны ўніверсітэт імя Ефрасінні Полацкай; Russian: Полоцкий государственный университет имени Евфросинии Полоцкой) is a public university in Novopolotsk and Polotsk, Belarus.

The university is named after Saint Euphrosyne of Polotsk, the daughter of the prince of Polotsk.

== History ==
In 1580, the Jesuit College was founded in Polotsk. On January 12, 1812, an ukase issued by Tsar Alexander I of Russia reclassified the college as the Polotsk Jesuit Academy. The academy operated from 1812 to 1820 and was the first higher education institution in Belarus.

On July 14, 1968, the Novopolotsk branch of the Belarusian Polytechnic Institute (BPI) was established. It was renamed the Belarusian Technological Institute on February 10, 1969. Later, on January 1, 1974, it became the Novopolotsk Polytechnic Institute, named after the Leninist Young Communist League of Belarus. On September 14, 1993, the institute was reorganized as Polotsk State University.

Since 2005, the Faculty of History and Philology has been located in the former Jesuit College in Polotsk, followed by the Faculty of Information Technologies in 2008.

As of 2016, the Faculty of Law and the Faculty of Physical Training and Education have been based in Mezhdurechye.

== Symbols ==
The university's seal features the original buildings of the Jesuit College in Polotsk. The university's anthem was written by Belarusian poet Hienadz Buraukin in 2003.

== See also ==
- Education in Belarus
- Jesuit College in Polotsk
- List of Jesuit sites
- List of universities in Belarus
