= BIS =

Bis or BIS may refer to:

- bis, a Latin word meaning 'twice'

== Arts and entertainment ==
=== Music ===
- BIS Records, a Swedish record label
- Bis Music, a Cuban record label
- Bis (Scottish band), a Scottish Indie pop band
- Bis (Japanese rock band)
- Bis (Japanese idol group)
- Canibus

=== Other uses in arts and entertainment ===
- Bis (film), a 2015 French comedy film
- Bis (magazine), a Japanese fashion magazine
- Bis Télévisions, a French TV station
- Bis, a Brazilian pay TV channel of Canais Globo
- Mario & Luigi: Bowser's Inside Story, a 2009 video game

== Businesses and organizations ==
- Banca Italiana di Sconto, a defunct Italian bank
- Bank for International Settlements, an international financial institution
- Benevolent Irish Society, a Canadian philanthropic organization
- Bezpečnostní informační služba, the Czech Security Information Service
- BIS hallmark, a jewellery hallmarking in India
- Bloque Institucional Social Démocrata, a political party of the Dominican Republic
- Bohemia Interactive Studio, a Czech video game developer
- British Ice Skating, a British sports body
- British Interlingua Society, a British society
- British Interplanetary Society, a British space advocacy society
- Bureau of Indian Standards, a national standards body
- Bureau of Industry and Security, an agency of the United States Department of Commerce
- Department for Business, Innovation and Skills, a former British government department
- British Information Services, a British government propaganda organization
- Bureau of Investigation and Statistics, a defunct intelligence agency

== Education ==
- Bachelor of Business Information Systems, an undergraduate degree
- Bachelor of Independent Studies, or Bachelor of Interdisciplinary Studies, an undergraduate degree
- Bachelor of Integrated Studies, an undergraduate degree
- Bavarian International School, in Germany
- Bordeaux International School, in France
- Brisbane Independent School, in Australia
- British International School (disambiguation), the name of several schools

== Science and technology ==
- -bis, an IUPAC numerical multiplier for compound or complex features, meaning 2
- A colloquial name for N,N'-Methylenebisacrylamide (Bis-AA)
- Barratt Impulsiveness Scale, in psychology
- Behavioural Inhibition System, a brain-behavioral systems in reinforcement sensitivity theory
- BIS monitor or bispectral index, to assess the depth of anaesthesia
- BlackBerry Internet Service
- Boot Integrity Services, in Preboot Execution Environment specifications
- MAPPER, now known as BIS, is a fourth-generation programming language
- YTJ (Finnish government service), also known as Business Information System

== Other uses ==
- Bislama language (ISO 639 alpha-3 code bis)
- Bisj pole, or Bis pole, is a ritual artifact of the Asmat people of New Guinea
- Bismarck Municipal Airport, North Dakota, U.S., IATA code and FAA LID: BIS

== See also ==
- Bice, from the French bis, a green or blue pigment
