= Liberal arts education =

Traditional academic course in Western higher education

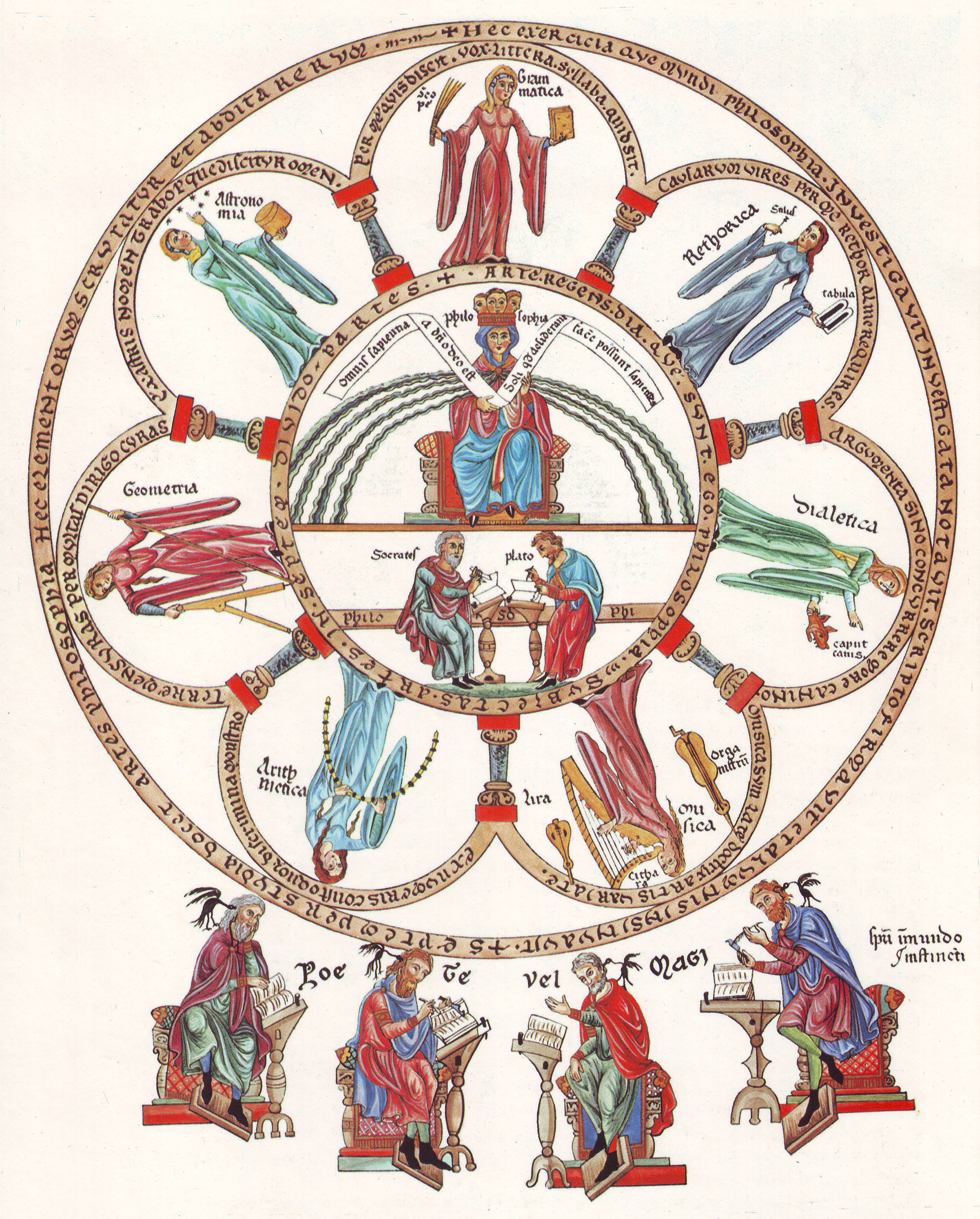
Philosophia et septem artes liberales, "philosophy and the seven liberal arts". From the Hortus deliciarum of Herrad of Landsberg (12th century)

Liberal arts education (from Latin liberalis 'free' and ars 'art or principled practice') is a traditional academic course in Western higher education, which traditionally covers the natural and formal sciences, social sciences, arts, and humanities. Liberal arts takes the term art in the sense of a learned skill rather than specifically the fine arts. Liberal arts education can refer to studies in a liberal arts degree course or to a university education more generally. Such a course of study contrasts with those that are principally vocational, professional, or technical, as well as religiously based courses.

The term liberal arts for an educational curriculum dates back to classical antiquity in the West, but has changed in meaning considerably, mostly expanding it. The seven subjects in the ancient and medieval meaning came to be divided into the trivium of rhetoric, grammar, and logic, and the quadrivium of astronomy, arithmetic, geometry, and music. However, there are hundreds of modern disciplines of study that now support modern professions and are traditionally recognised as liberal arts throughout academia. Some of the most popular liberal arts disciplines include: anthropology, English, literature, fine arts, foreign languages, philosophy, psychology, sociology, music, journalism, economics, law, communications, architecture, creative arts, art, history, and the formal and natural sciences. Degrees in liberal studies are often confused with those in a liberal arts discipline. Liberal studies refers to degrees with a broad curriculum, across multiple liberal arts disciplines and/or sciences and technologies.

Apart from the sciences, enrollment in liberal arts degree programs has been declining in the 2010s and 2020s in the United States, in part due to a perception of worse job prospects. As of 2023, liberal arts degrees holders in the United States had a median wage of US$60,000, as opposed to $70,000 for all degree holders. As a result, liberal arts colleges and schools are popularly rebranding themselves as more vague and encompassing areas of study, such as arts and social sciences, arts and sciences and, the humanities.

== History ==
=== Classical ===
Before they became known by their Latin variations (artes liberales, septem artes liberales, studia liberalia), the liberal arts were the continuation of Ancient Greek methods of inquiry that began to form the "disciplines of the mediaeval quadrivium". In the 4th-century-BC Athens, the government of the polis, or city-state, respected the ability of rhetoric or public speaking above almost everything else. Eventually rhetoric, grammar, and dialectic (logic) became the educational programme of the trivium. Together they came to be known as the seven liberal arts. Originally these subjects or skills were held by classical antiquity to be essential for a free person (liberalis, "worthy of a free person") to acquire in order to take an active part in civic life, something that included among other things participating in public debate, defending oneself in court, serving on juries, and participating in military service. While the arts of the quadrivium might have appeared prior to the arts of the trivium, by the Middle Ages educational programmes taught the trivium (grammar, logic, and rhetoric) first while the quadrivium (arithmetic, geometry, music, astronomy) were the following stage of education.

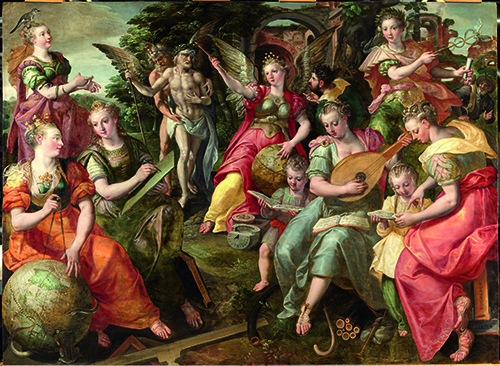
Allegory of the seven liberal arts, The Phoebus Foundation

Rooted in the basic curriculum – the eukuklios paideia or "well-rounded education" – of late Classical and Hellenistic Greece, the "liberal arts" or "liberal pursuits" (Latin liberalia studia) were already called so in formal education during the Roman Empire. The first recorded use of the term "liberal arts" (artes liberales) occurs in De Inventione by Marcus Tullius Cicero, but it is unclear if he created the term. Seneca the Younger discusses liberal arts in education from a critical Stoic point of view in Moral Epistles. The exact classification of the liberal arts varied in Roman times, and it was only after Martianus Capella in the 5th century influentially brought the seven liberal arts as bridesmaids to the Marriage of Mercury and Philology, that they took on canonical form.

=== Medieval ===
The four "scientific" artes – music, arithmetic, geometry, and astronomy – were known from the time of Boethius onwards as the quadrivium. After the 9th century, the remaining three arts of the "humanities" – grammar, logic, and rhetoric – were grouped as the trivium. It was in that two-fold form that the seven liberal arts were studied in the medieval Western university. During the Middle Ages, logic gradually came to take predominance over the other parts of the trivium.

In the 12th century the iconic image – Philosophia et septem artes liberales (Philosophy and seven liberal arts) – was produced by an Alsatian nun and abbess Herrad of Landsberg with her community of women as part of the Hortus deliciarum. Their encyclopedia compiled ideas drawn from philosophy, theology, literature, music, arts, and sciences and was intended as a teaching tool for women of the abbey. The image Philosophy and seven liberal arts represents the circle of philosophy, and is presented as a rosette of a cathedral: a central circle and a series of semicircles arranged all around. It shows learning and knowledge organised into seven relations, the Septem Artes Liberales or Seven Liberal Arts. Each of these arts find their source in the Greek φιλοσοφία, philosophia, literally "love of wisdom". St. Albert the Great, a doctor of the Catholic Church, asserted that the seven liberal arts were referred to in Sacred Scripture, saying: "It is written, 'Wisdom hath built herself a house, she hath hewn her out seven pillars' (Proverbs 9:1). This house is the Blessed Virgin; the seven pillars are the seven liberal arts."

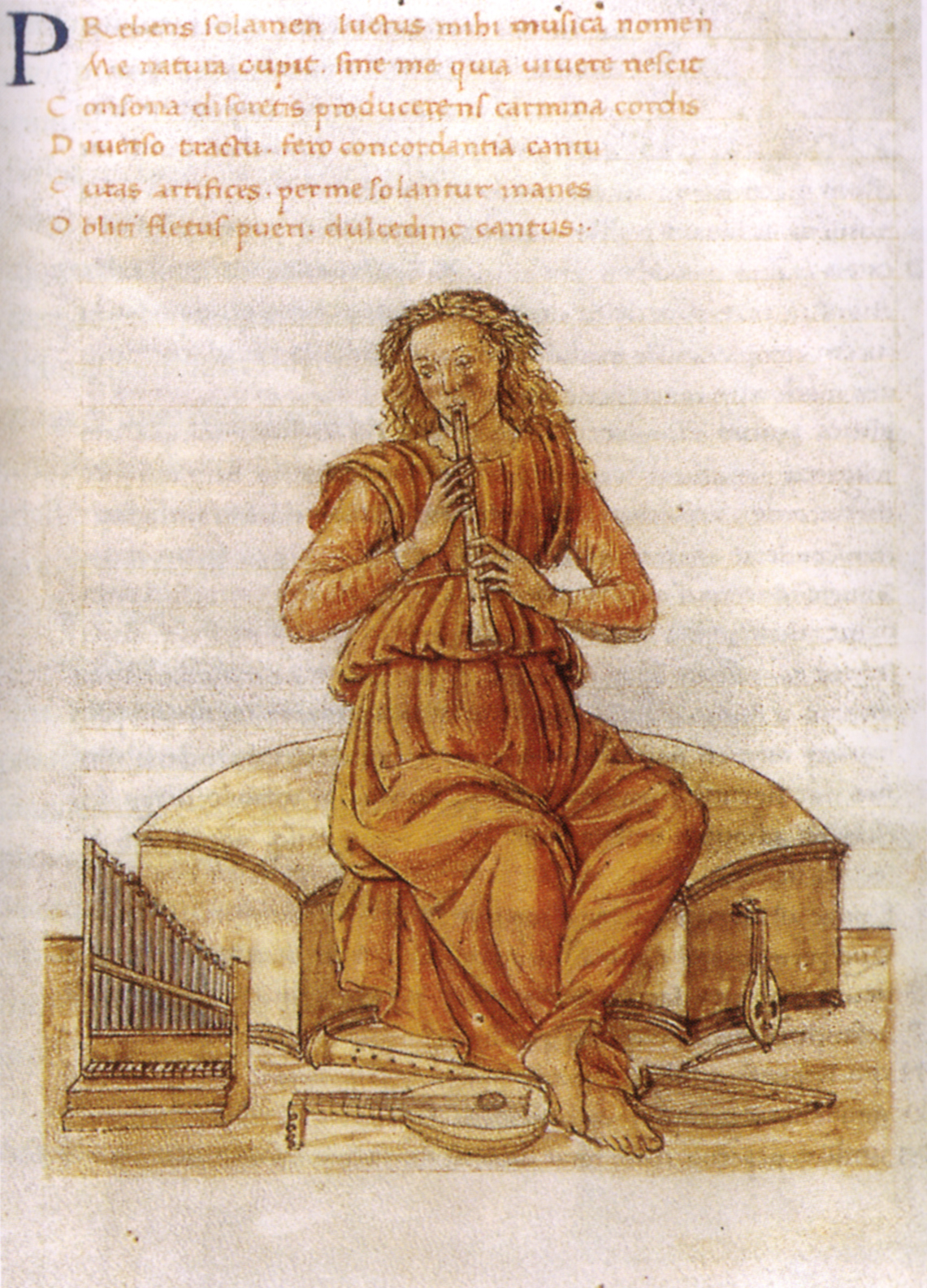
Page, with illustration of Music, from Marriage of Mercury and Philology

=== Early modern ===
In the Renaissance, the Italian humanists and their northern counterparts, despite in many respects continuing the traditions of the Middle Ages, reversed that process. Re-christening the old trivium with a new and more ambitious name: studia humanitatis, and also increasing its scope, they downplayed logic as opposed to the traditional Latin grammar and rhetoric, and added to them history, Greek, and moral philosophy (ethics), with a new emphasis on poetry as well. The educational curriculum of humanism, based on reading the great texts of Ancient Greece and Rome, spread throughout Europe during the sixteenth century and became the educational foundation for the schooling of European elites, the functionaries of political administration, the clergy of the various legally recognized churches, and the learned professions of law and medicine.

During the early modern period, liberal arts education became the preserve of secondary schools in continental Europe, with the universities concentrating on professional education. However, in England and Scotland arts education persisted in the universities, with professional teaching ceasing in the English universities as they became dominated by their colleges, which concentrated on teaching arts to the sons of the gentry.

In the Scottish universities, the liberal arts were extended in the 18th century to include modern physical sciences such as chemistry, mechanics and optics. In the late 18th and early 19th centuries, many Scottish graduates became professors in the United States, bringing their philosophy of liberal education to America and influencing the development of American liberal arts colleges.

=== 19th century ===
In 1800, the University of Oxford introduced an honours school in the liberal arts called literae humaniores ("more humane literature"). This was an interdisciplinary degree covering grammar, rhetoric, moral philosophy and (until split into a separate honours school in 1807) mathematics and physical sciences, continuing the tradition of studia humanitatis. Commonly called "Greats", this liberal arts course became seen as "the university course above all others with a reputation for producing educated men".

The increased specialisation of honours degrees led to the erosion of the broad core arts curriculum and the eventual separation of the pass degree course from the honours course in the second half of the 19th century, forming what would become the general degree. In 1855, the subjects of examination for the pass degree at Durham were a subset of those for the honours degrees, but by 1857 the subjects of examination for the pass degree and the honours degrees were listed separately, with some subjects, such as modern languages, only offered in the pass degree. (Note: The regulations printed in the main body of the university calendar were the same in the 1857 calendar as the 1855 calendar, but were updated for the 1858 calendar.) Cambridge introduced a "general" exam for the ordinary degree in 1861, along with "special" exams in optional subjects, including ones such as engineering that did not have honours tripod. In 1872, Oxford instituted the 'pass school', separating the pass degree from the honours schools and defining three groups of subjects (literae humaniores; languages, politics and law; and mathematics and the sciences) that could be studied for the pass degree. Elements of religious knowledge was added as a fourth group in 1886 and military studies in 1904, but the pass school did not prove popular, falling from 30% of undergraduates in the 1870s to 16% by 1910. Similarly in the Scottish universities, the requirement that students must pass all the subjects of the pass degree in order to gain an honours degree was changed in 1892 by an ordinance of the Scottish university commissioners to only require passes in five subjects, compared with seven subjects for the pass degree.

The ideal of a liberal arts, or humanistic education grounded in classical languages and literature, persisted in Europe until the middle of the twentieth century. In the United States, it came under increasingly successful attack in the late 19th century by academics interested in reshaping American higher education around the natural and social sciences.

=== After World War One ===
Oxford introduced the philosophy, politics and economics (PPE) degree in the 1920s as "modern greats", covering a similar breath to the literae humaniores degree but better aligned with the needs of the modern world than the older, classics-based degree. By 2024, the degree had been taken up by more than 40 other British universities, over 20 universities in the Commonwealth, and more than 75 American institutions, and was referred to by Forbes as "combin[ing] the prestige of traditional university education in the liberal arts with a suggestion of an influential future career".

In 1920, John Erskine launched the 'general honors' course at Columbia University as part of the core curriculum that had been established there the year before, starting the great books movement. Scott Buchanan, who introduced the great books curriculum at St. John's College in 1937, considered the great books to be an American version of the 'greats' and 'modern greats' he had encountered as a student at Oxford. However, modern scholars have noted that there was only an indirect link to the Oxford greats and that the great books courses grew directly out of workers' education programs.

== Modern usage ==
The modern use of the term liberal arts consists of three areas: the natural sciences, social sciences, and humanities. Academic areas that are associated with the term liberal arts include:

- Humanities: archaeology, art, history, literature, linguistics, philosophy, religion, modern languages, classical languages, music, theatre studies, etc.
- Social sciences: anthropology, business studies, economics, gender studies, human geography, law, politics, psychology, sociology, etc.
- Natural sciences: biology, chemistry, Earth sciences, physics, etc.

For example, the core courses for Georgetown University's Doctor of Liberal Studies program cover philosophy, theology, history, art, literature, and the social sciences. Wesleyan University's Master of Arts in Liberal Studies program includes courses in visual arts, art history, creative and professional writing, literature, history, mathematics, film, government, education, biology, psychology, and astronomy.

== Secondary school ==
Liberal arts education at the secondary school level prepares students for higher education at a university.

Curricula differ from school to school, but generally include language, chemistry, biology, geography, art, mathematics, music, history, philosophy, civics, social sciences, and foreign languages.

== In the United States ==
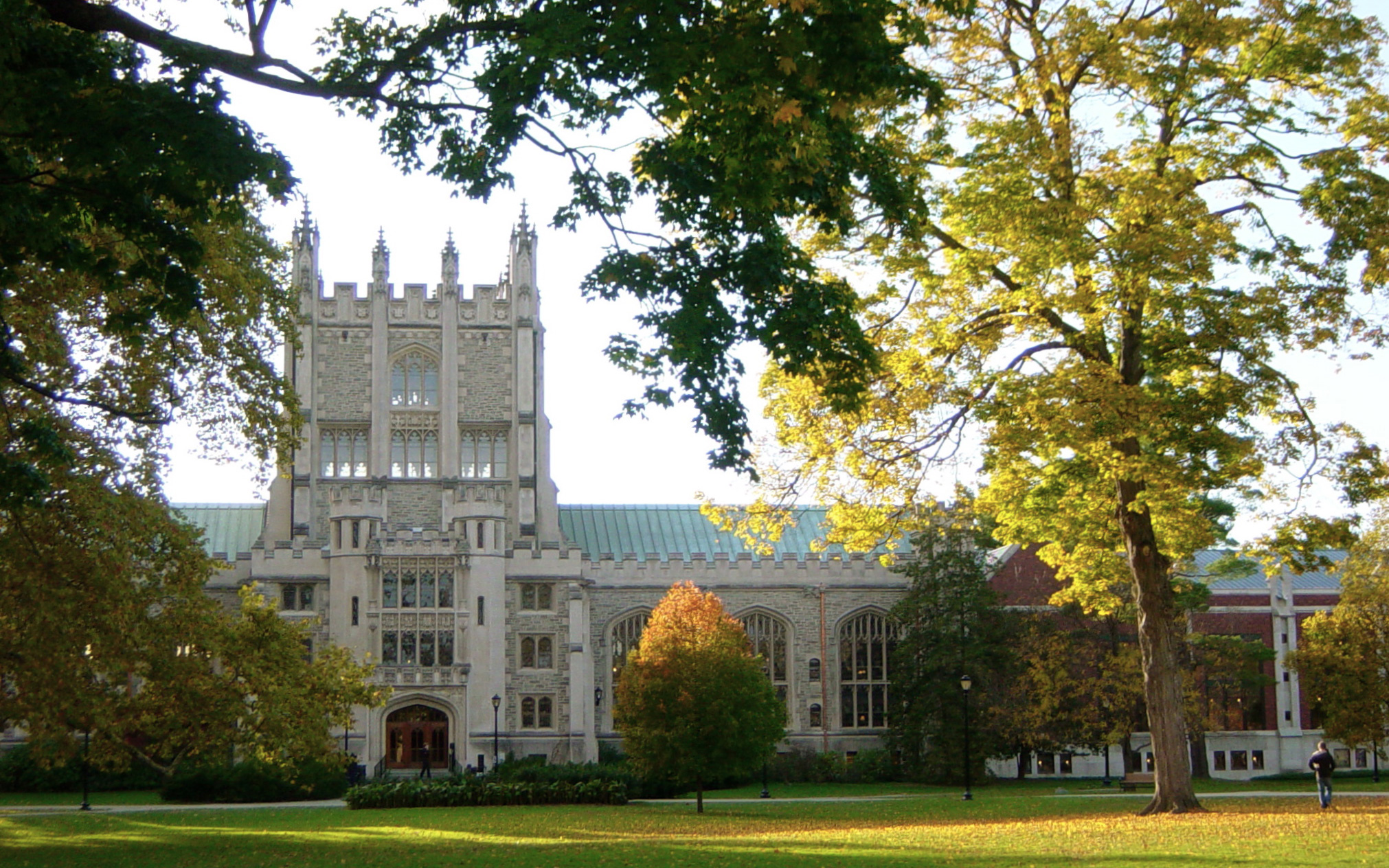
Thompson Library at Vassar College in New York

In the United States, liberal arts colleges are schools emphasizing undergraduate study in the liberal arts. The teaching at liberal arts colleges is often Socratic, typically with small classes; professors are often allowed to concentrate more on their teaching responsibilities than are professors at research universities.

Science and mathematics are integral to four-year liberal arts colleges, and indeed their graduates have been demonstrated to be more likely to apply to graduate school in science and mathematics than their peers and make up a higher proportion of National Academy of Science members than would usually be expected for the number of science and mathematics graduates produced by an institution.

Liberal arts programs encourage interdisciplinary study and international academic opportunities. Those in pursuant in fields such as Linguistics may participate in study-abroad programs or international research experiences, particular to studying languages, language documentation or regional dialects. This can be valuable for fields that examine language variation and communication across societies.

Traditionally, a bachelor's degree in one particular area within liberal arts, with substantial study outside that main area, is earned over four years of full-time study. However, some universities such as Saint Leo University, Pennsylvania State University, Florida Institute of Technology, and New England College have begun to offer an associate degree in liberal arts. Colleges like the Thomas More College of Liberal Arts offer a unique program with only one degree offering, a Bachelor of Arts in Liberal Studies, while the Harvard Extension School offers both a Bachelor of Liberal Arts and a Master of Liberal Arts. Additionally, colleges like the University of Oklahoma College of Liberal Studies and the Harvard Extension School offer an online, part-time option for adult and nontraditional students.

Most students earn either a Bachelor of Arts degree or a Bachelor of Science degree.

=== Great Books movement ===
==== Origins (1910s–1930s) ====
The movement's intellectual roots lie in Charles William Eliot’s Harvard Classics (1909) and in John Erskine’s “General Honors” course at Columbia (1919), where primary texts replaced survey textbooks. Erskine's colleagues Mortimer J. Adler and Robert Maynard Hutchins exported the seminar model to Chicago in 1931, contending that sustained engagement with classic works would provide a common stock of ideas essential to democratic citizenship.

In 1937 St. John's College radically shifted its curriculum to focus on the Great Books of the Western World, aiming to provide a form of liberal arts education that stood apart from increasingly specialized nature of higher education.

==== Consolidation and popularisation (1940s–1950s) ====
Hutchins, Adler and labour organiser Henry Johnson founded the nonprofit Great Books Foundation in 1947 to sponsor adult discussion groups nationwide.

In 1952, Encyclopædia Britannica published a 54 volume set titled the Great Books of the Western World under the direction of Robert Hutchins and Mortimer Adler. It was published in a second edition with an updated 60 volumes in 1990.

==== Critique and decline (1960s–1980s) ====
During the cultural upheavals of the 1960s the movement attracted criticism for privileging Euro-American male authors and for treating texts ahistorically. Louis Menand observes that its classroom practice “positioned itself against the grain of academic disciplinary paradigms,” thereby provoking recurring disputes over expertise and identity politics. Journalists likewise questioned its relevance: a 1992 Washington Post profile of St. John's dubbed the college “the ultimate anachronism” for focusing on “dead white men,” even as it praised graduates’ analytical skills.

In 1990, a second edition was released, expanding the collection to 60 volumes and updating its content to reflect more contemporary works and scholarship.

==== Revival and diversification (1990s–present) ====
Amid concern over declining humanities enrolments, a Chronicle of Higher Education survey in 1999 identified eleven new or revitalised great-books programmes at U.S. campuses, often launched with support from the National Association of Scholars. Many such curricula now incorporate works by women and non-Western authors, while advocates argue that juxtaposing, for example, Homer and Toni Morrison demonstrates the canon's adaptability to diverse classrooms.

===== Interest among Muslim education institutions =====
Today, many neo-traditional Muslim scholars such as Shaykh Hamza Yusuf and Shaykh Abdal Hakim Murad (Tim Winter) have advocated for learning the Great Books of the Western World and the Liberal Arts tradition, noting that Muslims have long since been directly involved in promoting and advocating for the trivium and quadrivium. As such, students of Zaytuna College and Cambridge Muslim College generally have an appreciation for these sciences.

==== Legacy ====
Great-books seminars remain core requirements at Columbia, Chicago and St. John's, underpin discussion groups run by the Great Books Foundation, and inform executive-education offerings at the Aspen Institute. Supporters contend that shared inquiry into enduring questions fosters civic deliberation, whereas detractors view the canon as an exclusionary relic. The debate itself confirms the movement's enduring cultural resonance.

== In Europe ==
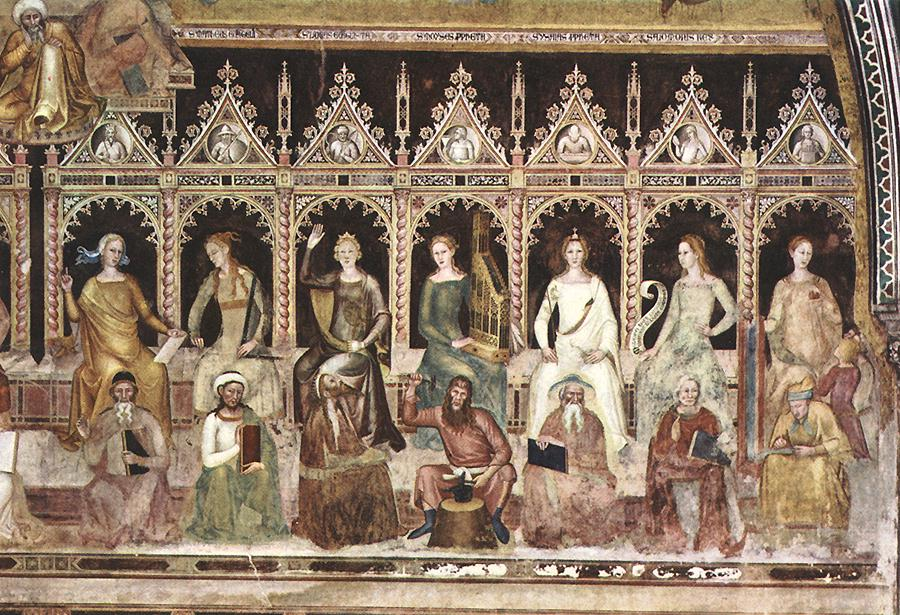
Triumph of St.Thomas & Allegory of the Sciences by Andrea di Bonaluto. Frasco, 1365–68, Basilica di S. Maria Novella.

In most parts of Europe, liberal arts education is deeply rooted. In Germany, Austria and countries influenced by their education system, it is called 'humanistische Bildung' (humanistic education). The term is not to be confused with some modern educational concepts that use a similar wording. Educational institutions that see themselves in that tradition are often a Gymnasium (high school, grammar school). They aim at providing their pupils with comprehensive education (Bildung) to form personality with regard to a pupil's own humanity as well as their innate intellectual skills. Going back to the long tradition of the liberal arts in Europe, education in the above sense was freed from scholastic thinking and re-shaped by the theorists of the Enlightenment; in particular, Wilhelm von Humboldt. Since students are considered to have received a comprehensive liberal arts education at gymnasia, very often the role of liberal arts education in undergraduate programs at universities is reduced compared to the US educational system. Students are expected to use their skills received at the gymnasium to further develop their personality in their own responsibility, e.g. in universities' music clubs, theatre groups, language clubs, etc. Universities encourage students to do so and offer respective opportunities, but do not make such activities part of the university's curriculum.

Thus, on the level of higher education, despite the European origin of the liberal arts college, the term liberal arts college usually denotes liberal arts colleges in the United States. With the exception of pioneering institutions such as Franklin University Switzerland (formerly known as Franklin College), established as a Europe-based, US-style liberal arts college in 1969, only recently some efforts have been undertaken to systematically "re-import" liberal arts education to continental Europe, as with Leiden University College The Hague, University College Utrecht, University College Maastricht, Amsterdam University College, Roosevelt Academy (now University College Roosevelt), University College Twente (ATLAS), Erasmus University College, the University of Groningen, Bratislava International School of Liberal Arts, Leuphana University of Lüneburg, Central European University, and Bard College Berlin, formerly known as the European College of Liberal Arts. Central European University launched a liberal arts undergraduate degree in Culture, Politics, and Society in 2020 as part of its move to Vienna and accreditation in Austria. As well as the colleges listed above, some universities in the Netherlands offer bachelors programs in Liberal Arts and Sciences (Tilburg University). Liberal arts (as a degree program) is just beginning to establish itself in Europe. For example, University College Dublin offers the degree, as does St. Marys University College Belfast, both institutions coincidentally on the island of Ireland. In the Netherlands, universities have opened constituent liberal arts colleges under the terminology university college since the late 1990s. The four-year bachelor's degree in Liberal Arts and Sciences at University College Freiburg is the first of its kind in Germany. It started in October 2012 with 78 students. The first Liberal Arts degree program in Sweden was established at Gothenburg University in 2011, followed by a Liberal Arts Bachelor Programme at Uppsala University's Campus Gotland in the autumn of 2013. The first Liberal Arts program in Georgia was introduced in 2005 by American-Georgian Initiative for Liberal Education (AGILE), an NGO. Thanks to their collaboration, Ilia State University became the first higher education institution in Georgia to establish a liberal arts program.

In France, Chavagnes Studium, a Liberal Arts Study Centre in partnership with the Institut Catholique d'études supérieures, and based in a former Catholic seminary, is launching a two-year intensive BA in the Liberal Arts, with a distinctively Catholic outlook. It has been suggested that the liberal arts degree may become part of mainstream education provision in the United Kingdom, Ireland and other European countries. In 1999, the European College of Liberal Arts (now Bard College Berlin) was founded in Berlin and in 2009 it introduced a four-year Bachelor of Arts program in Value Studies taught in English, leading to an interdisciplinary degree in the humanities.

The Open University's 'open programme' – originally the general degree – was the first interdisciplinary honours degree in the UK, introduced in 1969, and is considered to have pioneered liberal arts-style education in the country. The first of the modern wave of liberal arts degrees was induced by the University of Winchester in 2010. This was closely followed by University College London, which introduced an interdisciplinary arts and sciences degree in 2012. Birmingham also introduced a broad liberal arts degree spanning the arts and the sciences in 2013, while most other liberal arts degrees concentrated on the humanities. The liberal arts course at Durham University is an older degree, having been introduced under the title of combined honours in 1985, replacing the general arts pass degree that had been offered from the early days of the university. It was compared by The Times to US liberal arts degrees, and the course was renamed "liberal arts" by 2016. An analysis in 2023 found that there were 18,195 students on liberal arts and similar interdisciplinary courses in 2021/22. The largest courses in terms of full-time first degree student numbers were Exeter (655 students), Newcastle (540), UCL (475), Birmingham (355), Derby (335) and Durham (335), and another six year between 100 and 300 students. However, interdisciplinary course numbers were dominated by part-time students at the Open University, with 13,980 first degree students – over three quarters of the total.

The Bratislava International School of Liberal Arts (BISLA), a private institution located in the Old Town of Bratislava, Slovakia, is the first liberal arts college in Central Europe and has been granting three-year degrees since its opening in September 2006.

== In Asia ==
The Commission on Higher Education of the Philippines mandates a General Education curriculum required of all higher education institutions; it includes a number of liberal arts subjects, including history, art appreciation, and ethics, plus interdisciplinary electives. Many universities have much more robust liberal arts core curricula; most notably, the Jesuit universities such as Ateneo de Manila University have a strong liberal arts core curriculum that includes philosophy, theology, literature, history, and the social sciences.

Forman Christian College is a liberal arts university in Lahore, Pakistan. It is one of the oldest institutions in the Indian subcontinent. It is a chartered university recognized by the Higher Education Commission of Pakistan. Aga Khan University offers a liberal arts education in the arts and sciences in Karachi, Pakistan, and Habib University in Karachi, Pakistan offers a liberal arts and sciences program to its students through its liberal core program which is compulsory for all undergraduate degree students.

In India, there are many institutions that offer undergraduate (UG or bachelor's degree/diploma), postgraduate (PG or master's degree/diploma), as well as doctoral (PhD) and postdoctoral studies and research in this academic discipline.

Elsewhere in Asia, Lingnan University in Hong Kong, Asian University for Women and University of Liberal Arts Bangladesh are other liberal arts colleges. International Christian University in Tokyo is the first and one of the very few liberal arts universities in Japan. Fulbright University Vietnam is the first liberal arts institution in Vietnam.

== In Australia ==
Campion College is a Roman Catholic dedicated liberal arts college, located in the western suburbs of Sydney. Founded in 2006, it is the first tertiary educational liberal arts college of its type in Australia. Campion offers a Bachelor of Arts in the Liberal Arts as its sole undergraduate degree. The key disciplines studied are history, literature, philosophy, and theology.

The Millis Institute is the School of Liberal Arts at Christian Heritage College located in Brisbane. Founded by Dr. Ryan Messmore, former President of Campion College, the Millis Institute offers a Bachelor of Arts in the Liberal Arts in which students can choose to major in philosophy, theology, history or literature. It also endorses a 'Study Abroad' program whereby students can earn credit towards their degree by undertaking two units over a five-week program at the University of Oxford. As of 2022, Elizabeth Hillman is currently the President of the Millis Institute.

A new school of Liberal Arts has been formed in the University of Wollongong; the new Arts course entitled 'Western Civilisation' was first offered in 2020. The interdisciplinary curriculum focuses on the classic intellectual and artistic literature of the Western tradition. Courses in the liberal arts have recently been developed at the University of Sydney and the University of Notre Dame.

== See also ==
- Artes Mechanicae – Latin for "the mechanical arts"
- Bachelor of General Studies
- Bachelor of Liberal Arts
- Bachelor of Liberal Studies
- Classical education
- Classical education movement
- College of Arts and Sciences
- Creative arts
- Doctor of Liberal Studies
- Education in ancient Greece
- Education in ancient Rome
- Education reform § Reforms of classical education
- Four arts
- General studies
- Great books
- Great Books programs in Canada
- Humanitas
- Humanities
- Interdisciplinarity
- Jesuit education (Eloquentia perfecta)
- Liberal arts college
- Liberal education
- List of liberal arts colleges
- STEAM fields
- Transcendentalism
