= Music Industry Arts =

Music Industry Arts may refer to:

- Fanshawe College's Music Industry Arts program
- List of music industry degree programs
