= List of music industry degree programs =

Major	Degree	College	Website
Music Business	Bachelor of Music	Wayne State University's College of Fine, Performing and Communication Arts	
Music industry recording arts	Associate of Science	St. Petersburg College	
Music industry	Bachelor of Arts	University of New Haven	
Music industry administration	Master of Arts	California State University's Tseng College	
Music industry	Bachelor of Science	Drexel University's Antoinette Westphal College of Media Arts and Design	
Music industry	Bachelor of Science	Francis Marion University	
Music industry arts and performance	3-year diploma	Centennial College	
Music industry arts	42 week diploma	Algonquin College	
Music industry studies	Master of Arts	York College of Pennsylvania	
Music industry studies	Bachelor of Arts	California State University, Northridge	
Music industry	Bachelor of Science	Rowan University	
Music with concentration in music industry	Bachelor of Arts	Indiana University Southeast	
Music industry	Bachelor of Music	Middle Tennessee State University	
Music with concentration in music industry	Bachelor of Science	Northeastern University	
Music industry	Bachelor of Music	Syracuse University	
Recording and Entertainment Industries	Bachelor of Science	Syracuse University	
Music Business	Master of Science	Syracuse University	
Music industry arts	2-year diploma	Fanshawe College	
Music production and recording arts	Bachelor of Science	Mercy University	
Music industry	Master of Arts	West Virginia University	
Music industry	Bachelor of Arts	West Virginia University	
Music with concentration in music industry	Bachelor of Arts	Missouri Southern State University	
Music arts management	Bachelor of Science	State University of New York at Plattsburgh	
Music industry	Associate of Science	Herkimer County Community College	
Global entertainment and music business	Master of Arts	Berklee College of Music Valencia Campus	
Music business/management	Bachelor of Music	Berklee College of Music	
Music industry-recording arts	Associate Degree	Jones County Junior College	
Music industry	Bachelor of Music	Eastern Kentucky University	
Music industry with concentration in recording arts	Bachelor of Music	Eastern Kentucky University	
Music business, entrepreneurship & technology	Bachelor of Science	University of the Arts	
Music technology	Bachelor of Science	Temple University	
Music industry studies	Bachelor of Arts	California State University, Northridge	
Music industry	Associate of Science in Individual Studies	SUNY Adirondack	
Music with minor in music business	Bachelor of Science	University of Colorado Denver	
Recording arts	Master of Science	University of Colorado Denver	
Music production and recording arts	Bachelor of Science	Elon University	
Contemporary music industry	Bachelor of Arts	Northwest University	
Music industry business	Bachelor of Arts	Northwest University	
Music business	Bachelor of Music	State University of New York at Potsdam's Crane School of Music	
Music Industry Studies	Bachelor of Arts	University of Texas at Arlington's College of Liberal Arts	
