= Texas Tech University at Abilene =

Coordinates: 32.468669°N 99.732224°W

Texas Tech University at Abilene is an official off campus teaching site of Texas Tech University located in Abilene, Texas. Degrees and certifications offered by the site include Bachelor of University Studies, Bachelor of General Studies, Graduate Certificate in Wind Energy and Ed.D. in educational leadership.

TTU at Abilene primary educational partner is Cisco College.

The site was established in 2002 at the request of community leaders in Abilene.

Courses are delivered through interactive video from the main Lubbock campus and by resident Abilene faculty. Some online coursework is required for completion of degrees.
