= Bachelor of Integrated Studies =

A Bachelor of Integrated Studies (BIS) is an interdisciplinary bachelor's degree offered by several universities in the United States, Singapore, and Canada. It allows students to design a customized and specific course of study to best suit their educational and professional objectives. Generally, this degree is sponsored by two or more departments within the university. Universities which confer the degree include the Singapore Management University, University of Cincinnati, University of North Texas, Northern Kentucky University, Utah Valley University, Miami University in Ohio, Pittsburg State University, George Mason University, Weber State University, Washburn University, Ferris State University, Jacksonville State University, Kennesaw State University, Oakland University, Nevada State College, Utah Tech University, Saint Anselm College, University of the Fraser Valley, University of New Brunswick, and the Florida Gulf Coast University, among others. The Bachelor of Integrated Studies is usually viewed as a Bachelor of Science.

According to materials issued by Weber State University:

The program best suits students who have developed a sense of their educational and life goals, and who are looking for ways to express those goals through a self-designed and self-directed university program. The BIS Program serves the needs of students who want to individualize or create a unique academic program; students who want to obtain a broad liberal education; and/or students who want to prepare for specific career goals and/or graduate school.

== See also ==
- Bachelor of Independent Studies
- Bachelor of General Studies
- Bachelor of Liberal Studies
