= Spaghetti Vabune! =

Japanese pop band

- Origin: Hyogo, Japan
- Genres: Indie pop, neo-Shibuya-kei, J-pop, jangle pop, alternative rock
- Years active: 2001–present
- Label: Bluebadge Label
- Members: Chee/Chiiko
- Website: www.vabune.com

Spaghetti Vabune! is a Japanese pop band based in Hyogo Prefecture, Japan. They have been active since 2001 and have released two studio albums along with several EPs. Their guitar-driven indie pop music takes inspiration from the Shibuya-kei scene of the early 1990s, notably Flipper's Guitar (whose song Cool Spy on a Hot Car they covered for a tribute project to the band), as well as Western twee and jangle pop bands.

The band has played live in Japan sporadically since 2001 and enjoy limited success overseas. Their track Tiger was featured on BBC Radio 6's 'Introducing' programme, and was subsequently elected onto a year-end 'best of' compilation show.

== Discography ==
=== Studio albums ===
- Summer Vacation, Sunset Vehicle (2003)
- Guitar Pop Grand Prix (2006)

=== Singles/EPs ===
- Cherokee/Chocolate Song (2003)
- Eight Players EP (2004)
- Summer Boy, Summer Girl EP (2008)
- Sports and Study EP (2008)
