= Mogra (disambiguation) =

Mogra is a common name of the flower Jasminum sambac in North India

Mogra may refer to:

- Mogra, Hooghly (also spelt Magra) a village in West Bengal, India
- Mogra Badshahpur, a city and a municipal board in Jaunpur district in Uttar Pradesh, India
- Ibrahim Mogra (born 1965), a British imam
- Mogra (nightclub), a Japanese nightclub in Akihabara, Tokyo
