= Kenji Ozawa =

Japanese musician (born 1968)

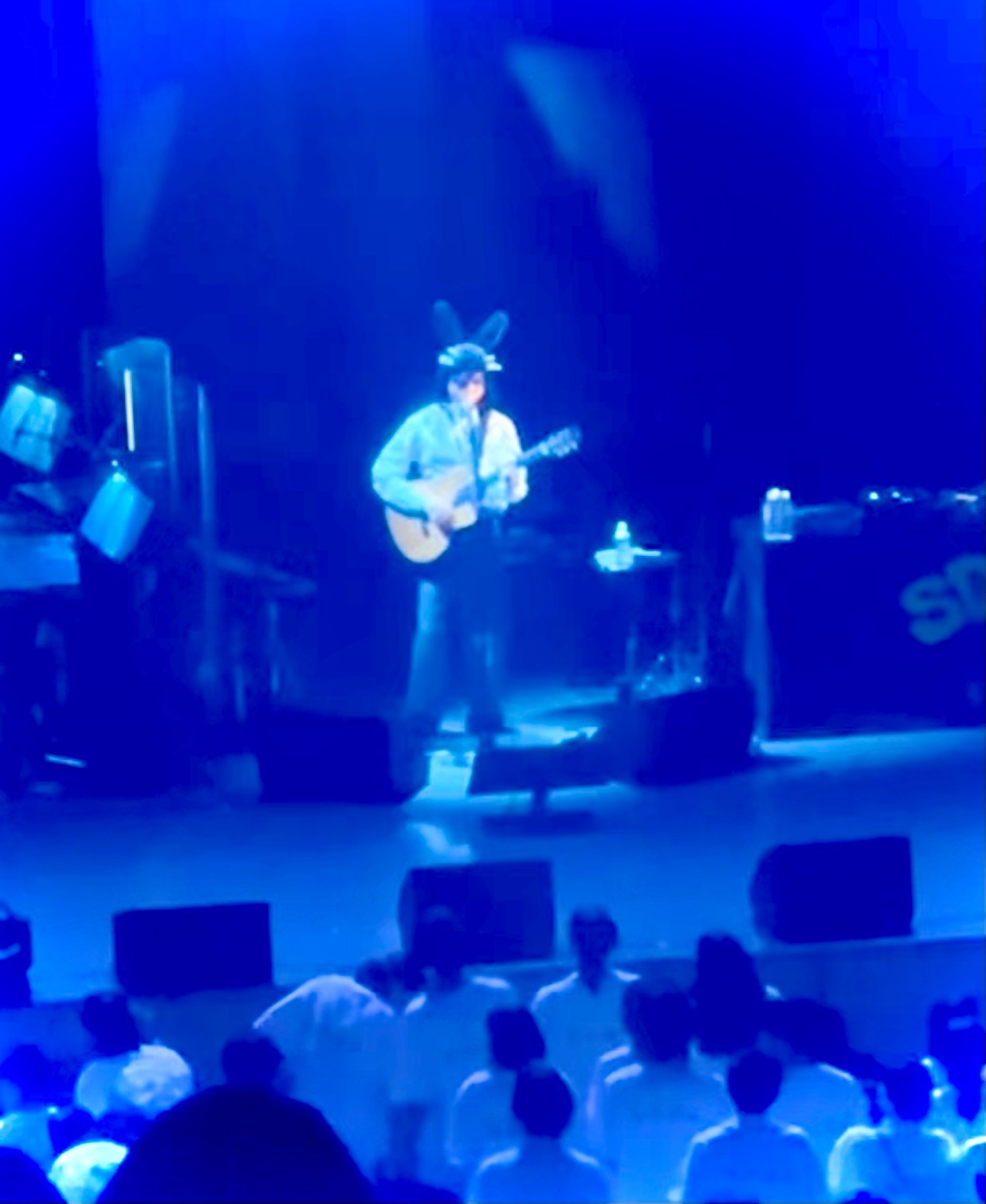
- On stage in 2024

Background information
- Born: 14 April 1968 (age 58)
- Genres: Pop; J-pop; Shibuya-kei
- Instruments: Vocals; guitar; synthesizers
- Years active: 1987–present
- Labels: EMI Music Japan; Virgin Music/Universal Music
- Website: 小沢健二 ひふみよ Official Site

Kenji Ozawa (小沢 健二, Ozawa Kenji) is a Japanese musician, designer and writer. Ozawa was a member of the pop duo Flipper's Guitar, and is among the earliest practitioners of the Shibuya-kei musical genre. He graduated from the University of Tokyo. His uncle, Seiji Ozawa, was a noted conductor.

== Personal history ==
Ozawa was born on 14 April 1968, in Sagamihara, Kanagawa. His father Toshio Ozawa is a professor (German Literature) and his mother Makiko Ozawa is a clinical psychologist.

Ozawa's first claim to fame was as a member of the pop duo Flipper's Guitar. After the disband of the group, he debuted as a solo musician in 1993.

"Konya wa Boogie Back" (BOOGIE BACK), Ozawa's 3rd single released in 1994, which was a collaboration with Japanese Hip-Hop group Scha Dara Parr became a smash hit. The album "LIFE" was highly evaluated; it was voted No. 1 Album of 1990's J-pop/rock albums in a "Music Magazine".

After releasing several works, Ozawa stopped his activity as a musician in Japan after 1998. He released "Eclectic" in 2002, and "Ecology of Everyday Life" which was an instrumental album in 2006, and also started writing "USAGI!" a nursery-story-style writing about the social environment, but never showed up in front of the audiences as a pop musician.

In 2010, Ozawa suddenly announced a concert tour "Hihumiyo" and restarted his public activity in Japan, and held several events and concerts. Also he married American photographer Elizabeth Coll, later giving birth to two sons Rion and Amanu.

In 2017, "Ryuudoutai ni Tsuite (On Fluid)" was released as a CD. It has been 19 years since the last single was released. Album "So kakkoii Uchuu (So kakkoii Pluriverse)" was released in 2019.

== Discography ==
=== CD singles ===
	Title	English title	Released	Tracks	Note
1	Tenki Yomi	TENKI-YOMI	21 July 1993	1. Tenki Yomi; 2. Kurayami Kara Te Wo Nobase; 3. Tenki Yomi (Original Karaoke)	
2	Kurayami Kara Te Wo Nobase	REACH OUT OF THE DARKNESS	1 December 1993	1. Kurayami Kara Te Wo Nobase; 2. Yoru to Hidokei (swamp folk); 3. Kurayami Kara Te Wo Nobase (Original Karaoke)	
3	Konya Wa Boogie Back	BOOGIE BACK (nice vocal)	9 March 1994	1. Konya Wa Boogie Back (nice vocal); 2. Konya Wa Boogie Back (meanwhile back at the party); 3. Konya Wa Boogie Back (Karaoke for vocal)	released as [Kenji Ozawa featuring Scha Dara Parr] "Konya wa Boogie Back" (BOOGIE BACK (smooth rap)) is also released as [Scha Dara Parr feat. Kenji Ozawa]
4	Aishi Aisarete Ikirunosa / Tokyo Ren-ai Senka・Mata wa Koi wa Ittemirya Body Blow	Love Is What We Need / Love Is Like a Body Blow	20 July 1994	1. Aishi Aisarete Ikirunosa; 2. Tokyo Ren-ai Senka・Mata wa Koi wa Ittemirya Body Blow; 3. Aishi Aisarete Ikirunosa (Original Karaoke); 4. Tokyo Ren-ai Senka・Mata wa Koi wa Ittemirya Body Blow (Original Karaoke)	
5	Lovely	LOVELY	31 August 1994	1. Lovely; 2. Konya wa Boogie Back ("DISCO TO GO" LIVE)	Also released as Analog Single on 23 November 1995
6	Carolla II ni Notte	–	1 January 1995	1. Carolla II ni Notte; 2. Carolla II ni Notte (Original Karaoke)	Lyric / Music not written by Kenji Ozawa
7	Ozawa Kenji = Tsusumi Kyohei Song Book Tsuyoi Kimochi Tsuyoi Ai / Sore wa Chotto	Metropolitan Love Affair / I'm Afraid Not	28 February 1995	1. Tsuyoi Kimochi Tsuyoi Ai; 2. Sore wa Chotto	Music written by Kyōhei Tsutsumi
8	Door wo Knock Suru Nowa Dareda?	Who's Gonna Knock the Door?	29 March 1995	1. Door wo Knock Suru Nowa Dareda? (Boys Life Pt.1: Christmas Story); 2. Door wo Knock Suru Nowa Dareda? ("THE LIFE SHOW" LIVE); 3. Door wo Knock Suru Nowa Dareda? (Door Knock Shippai!); 4. Door wo Knock Suru Nowa Dareda? (Original Karaoke)	
9	Senjo no Boys Life	–	17 May 1995	1. Senjo no Boys Life (Boys Life pt.2: Ai wa Message); 2. Bokura ga Tabi ni Deru Riyuu (THE LIFE SHOW Live); 3. Senjo no Boys Life (Boys Life pt.2: Ai wa Message) (Original Karaoke)	
10	Sayonara Nante Ienaiyo	NEVER CAN SAY GOODBYE	8 November 1995	1. Sayonara Nante Ienaiyo; 2. Icho Namiki no Serenade (LIVE AT BUDOKAN); 3. Sayonara Nante Ienaiyo (Original Karaoke)	
11	Tsuukai Ukiuki Doori	–	20 December 1995	1. Tsuukai Ukiuki Doori; 2. Nagareboshi Be Bop; 3. Tsuukai Ukiuki Doori (Original Karaoke); 4. Nagareboshi Be Bop (Original Karaoke)	
12	Bokura ga Tabi ni Deru Riyuu (Single Edit)	Letters, Lights, Travels On the Streets (Single Edit)	16 May 1996	1. Bokura ga Tabi ni Deru Riyuu (Single Edit); 2. Ryusei Be Bop (Revue'96 Live 96/03/09 Yokohama Arena); 3. Bokura ga Tabi ni Deru Riyuu (Original Karaoke)	
13	Otona ni Nareba	–	30 September 1996	1. Otona ni Nareba; 2. Kyuutai no Kanaderu Ongaku; 3. Otona ni Nareba (inst.)	
14	Yume ga Yume nara	–	29 November 1996	1. Yume ga Yume Nara; 2. Yume ga Yume Nara (INST.)	
15	Buddy / Koishikute	–	16 July 1997	1. Buddy; 2. Koishikute; 3. Koitte Yappari; 4. Sore wa Chotto	Also released as Analog Single on 8 August 1997
16	Yubi Saemo / Dice wo Korogase	–	18 September 1997	1. back to back 2. Dice wo Korogase; 3. Yubi Saemo; 4. Ryusei Be Bop	Also released as Analog Single on the same date
17	Aru Hikari	–	10 December 1997	1. Aru Hikari (JFK 8'16" Full Length); 2. Aru Hikari (JFK 4'23" F.O.); 3. Utsukushisa	Also released as Analog Single on 1 January 1998
18	Haru ni Shite Kimi wo Omou	–	28 January 1998	1. Haru ni Shite Kimi wo Omou; 2. Haru ni shite Kimi wo Omou (Instrumental); 3. Aru HIkari [Secret track]	
19	Ryuudoutai ni Tsuite	On Fluid	22 February 2017	1. Ryuudoutai ni Tsuite; 2. Shimpiteki; 3. Ryuudoutai ni Tsuite (instrumental); 4. Shimpiteki (instrumental)	
20	Fukurou no Koe ga Kikoeru	I Hear an Owl	6 September 2017	1. Fukurou no Koe ga Kikoeru; 2. Cinnamon; 3. Fukurou no Koe ga Kikoeru (instrumental); 4. Cinnamon (instrumental)	Released as Ozawa Kenji to Sekai no Owari
21	Arpeggio (Kitto Mahou no Tunnel no Saki)	Arpeggio (Through The Wondrous Tunnel)	14 February 2018	1. Arpeggio (Kitto Mahou no Tunnel no Saki); 2. Lovely (Live in the Rain On a Yakatabune in Tokyo Bay) [Ozawa Kenji to Hikari Mitsushima]; 3. Arpeggio (Kitto Mahou no Tunnel no Saki)	
22	Hikou Suru Kimi to Boku no Tameni / Unmei, Toiuka UFO ni (Do it Do it)	The Crescent Shines / Destiny or an UFO	22 December 2021	1. Hikou Suru Kimi to Boku no Tameni; 2. Unmei, Toiuka UFO ni (Do it Do it); 3. Hikou Suru Kimi to Boku no Tameni (Instrumental); 4. Unmei, Toiuka UFO ni (Do it Do it) (	

=== Digital singles ===
	Title	English title	Released	Note
1	Shikkasho Bushi		6 July 2010	
2	Tsuyoi Kimochi Tsuyoi Ai (1995 DAT Mix)	Metropolitan Love Affair (1995 DAT Mix)	4 April 2019	
3	Suisei	Like A Comet	11 October 2019	
4	Ultraman Zenbu	Ultraman Zenbu	9 March 2021	
5	El Fuego (The Honoo)	El Fuego	21 April 2021	
6	Naichau	Makes My Cry	26 May 2021	
7	Lovely (Remaster Short Edit)	Lovely (Remaster Short Edit)	21 December 2022	Analog Record also released on 27 January 2023
8	Haru ni Shite Kimi wo Omou (2023 Remaster)	Childish Tango (2023 Remaster)	20 June 2023	
9	Toudai Kyuuhyakubankoudou Kougi ep	1. Noize; 2. River Suite Kawa No Kumikyoku Arpeggio(Kitto Mahou No Tunnel No Saki)/Ichounamiki No Serenade (Tokyo Garden Theater Live 2022)	12 January 2024	Track 1 Vocal: Mahito The People

=== Albums ===
	Title	English title	Released	Note	JPN
1st	Inu wa Hoeru ga Caravan wa Susumu	–	29 September 1993	re-released as "dogs" in 1997 Re-issued as the original title with bonus disc in 2021	9
2nd	LIFE	LIFE	31 August 1994	Also released as an Analog Record	5
3rd	Kyuutai no Kanaderu Ongaku	–	16 October 1996		1
4th	Eclectic	Eclectic	27 February 2002		7
–	Setsuna	–	27 December 2003	Compilation Album	29
5th	Ecology of Everyday Life Mainichi no Kankyou Gaku	–	8 March 2006	Instrumental Album	35
–	Warera, Toki	–	19 March 2014	Live Album from "Hihumiyo" Tour in 2010. Limited Edition was originally released in 21 March 2012.	20
6th	So kakkoii Uchuu	So kakkoii Pluriverse	13 November 2019		3

=== Written works ===
- DOOWUTCHYALiKE (1994–1997)
- USAGI! (2005–2017)
- Kigyo teki na shakai, Therapy teki na shakai (2007)
- Mahouteki Monologue Daihon (2016)
- Haru Sora Niji no sho (2017)
- Ice Cream ga Tokete Shimau Maeni (Kazuku no Halloween no tameno rensaku) as Ozawa Kenji to Nichibei Kyoufu Gakkai (2017) / Picture Book
- Toudai Kyuuhyakubankoudou Kougi Kyoukasho (2023) / Text book

=== Video program ===
- Tokyo, Music & Us 2017–2018 (Apple Music)

== Live performance ==
=== Concert / tour ===
- Hibiya Yagai Ongakudo Free Concert (1993)
- DISCO TO GO (1994)
- THE LIFE SHOW (1994)
- VILLAGE (1995)
- Revue'96 (1996)
- "lover" (1996)
- Hihumiyo (2010)
- Tokyo no Machi ga Kanaderu (2012)
- Mahouteki (2016)
- Haru no Kuuki ni Niji wo Kake (2018)
- Tobase wangan 2 nights, guitar bass drums de So kakkoii Uchuu e (2019)
- So kakkoii Uchuu Shows (2022)
- Toudai Kyuuhyakubankoudou Kougi (2023)
- Bugi Baku Baby [with Scha Dara Parr] (2024)
- Monochromatique (2024)
