= Akishibu-kei =

Cultural and musical trend of the 2000s

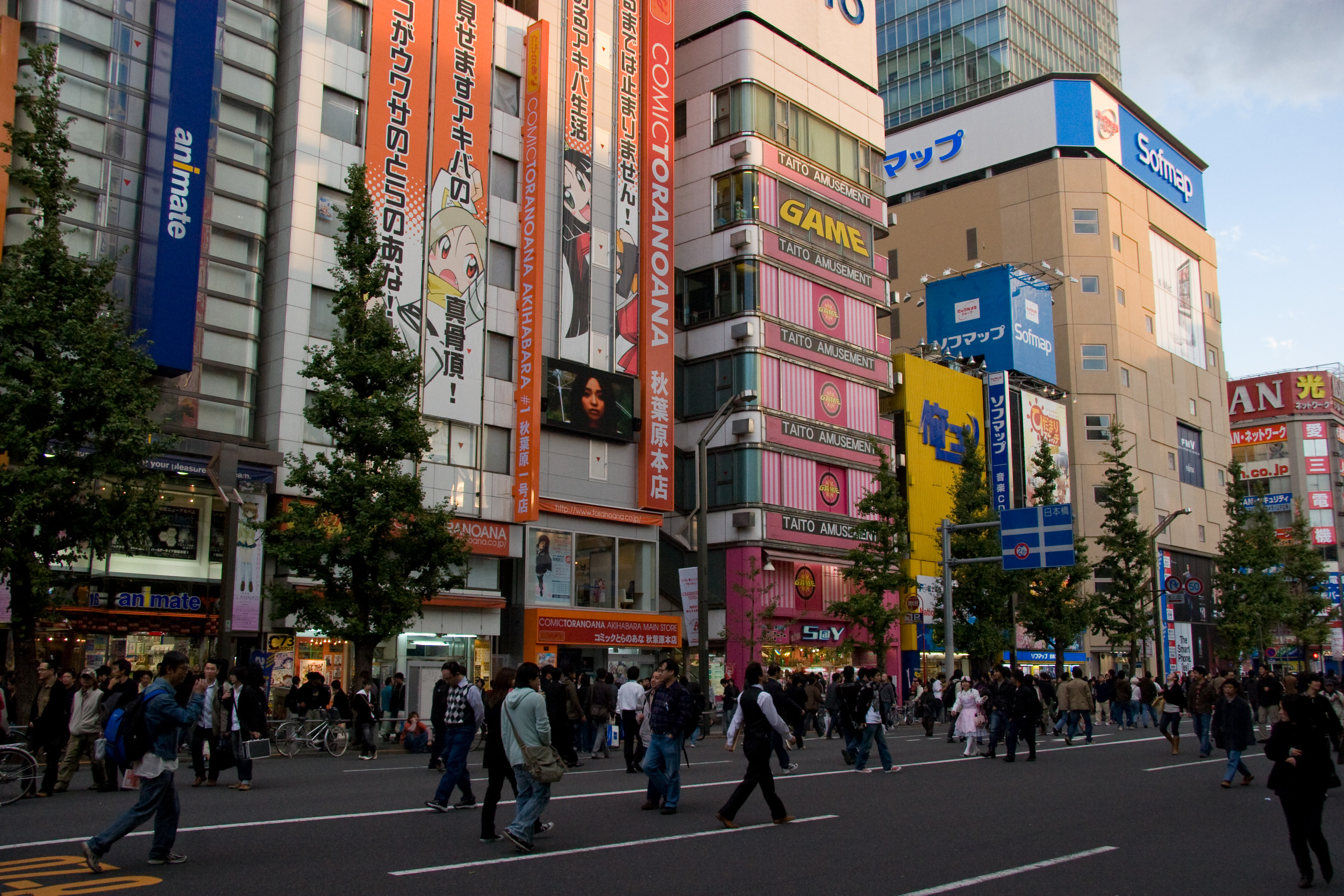
- Akihabara in 2007
- Native name: アキシブ系
- Stylistic origins: Shibuya-kei; Akiba-kei; lounge
- Cultural origins: 2000s, Tokyo, Japan

Akishibu-kei (Japanese: アキシブ系; lit. "Akihabara-Shibuya style") is a loosely defined trend from the 2000s that involved an increase of Shibuya-kei influence in anime soundtracks. The term is a portmanteau of "Shibuya-kei" and "Akiba-kei". Both were 1990s cultural movements associated with musical and otaku interests, respectively, and Akishibu-kei was thought to have represented a merging of the two.

== Overview ==
From the mid-1990s, anime music was diversified due to composers like Yoko Kanno who mastered idioms from many genres such as classical music, jazz and ethnic music. In 2002, Shibuya-kei band Round Table invited female singer Nino as the guest vocal and offered the song "Let Me Be With You" for anime Chobits. The soundtrack of Chobits was composed by Keitaro Takanami, the former member of Pizzicato Five. From then, Masao Fukuda from FlyingDog, the musical director of Chobits appointed many Shibuya-kei musicians as anisongs/anime soundtracks composers. Fukuda is considered as tastemaker of Akishibu-kei. Some artists from FlyingDog such as Kana Hanazawa was provided songs by Shibuya-kei composers. Hanazawa is considered as the representative singer of Akishibu-kei.

Dimitri from Paris (a Turkish-born French DJ) provided the song "Neko Mimi mode" to Tsukuyomi: Moon Phase as the opening theme. Since he was one of the contemporary artists popular among Shibuya-Kei fans, "Neko Mimi mode" is considered to be a representative song of Akishibu-kei music; however, this song is sometimes considered as an example of denpa song.

In 2007, a compilation album titled AKSB ~kore ga Akishibu-kei da!~ was released, which included tracks from prominent Akishibu-kei artists such as Round Table, Keitaro Takanami, and Dimitri from Paris. In writing about the compilation, W. David Marx of Diamond Agency remarked on the merger of Shibuya-kei and Akiba-kei: "Both subcultures strongly share one thing: The members are 'nerds' in the sense of being deeply obsessed with pop culture."

== Examples of Akishibu-Kei anime songs ==
- "Let me be with you" by ROUND TABLE featuring Nino (Opening theme of Chobits.Composed by Kitagawa Katsutoshi)
- "Onnanoko ♡ Otokonoko" by Yuko Ogura (Ending theme for School Rumble Composed by Yasuharu Konishi)
- "Neko Mimi mode" by Dimitri from Paris (Opening theme of Tsukuyomi: Moon Phase)
- "Little Goodbye" by Rocky Chack (Opening theme of Zegapain. Composed by Noe and Taro Yamashita)
- "Magic Number" by Maaya Sakamoto and "Jellyfish no Kokuhaku" by Megumi Nakajima (Opening and ending themes of Kobato. Composed by Katsutoshi Kitagawa and Dan Miyakawa, respectively)
- "Melody" and "Kazeiro no Film" by Megumi Nakajima (Opening and ending theme of Tamayura. Composed by Katsutoshi Kitagawa and Hiroyasu Yano, respectively)
- "Hello!" by Megumi Nakajima (Ending theme of Lagrange: The Flower of Rin-ne. Composed by Katsutoshi Kitagawa)
- "Zetsumetsu Kigu Shōjo!" by Haruka Chisuga (Opening theme of Zetsumetsu Kigu Shōjo Amazing Twins. Composed by Katsutoshi Kitagawa)
- "Momo Kyun Sword" by Haruka Chisuga (Ending theme of Momo Kyun Sword. Composed by Katsutoshi Kitagawa)
- "Tsunagarumade" by Megumi Nakajima (Ending theme of Sacred Seven. Composed by Dan Miyakawa)
- "Koi no Orchestra" and "Hōkago no Yakusoku" by Ayako Yoshitani (Opening and ending themes of Mysterious Girl X. Composed by Katsutoshi Kitagawa)
- "Haru no Prelude" by Round Table featuring Nino (Opening theme from One Off. Composed by Rieko Ito)
- "Dramatic Market Ride" by Aya Suzaki (Opening theme of Tamako Market Composed by Tomoko Kataoka)
- "Yukitoki", "Harumodoki", and "Megumi no Ame" by Yanagi Nagi (All opening themes of My Youth Romantic Comedy Is Wrong, As I Expected Composed by Kitagawa Katsutoshi)
- "Your Voice" by Rhodanthe* (Ending theme of Kin-iro Mosaic. Composed by Takeshi Nakatsuka)
- "Egao ni Naru" by Rina Satō and Asuka Ogame (Ending theme of Gourmet Girl Graffiti. Composed by Katsutoshi Kitagawa)
- "We Took Each Other's Hand" by Kaori Sawada (Second ending theme of School-Live. Composed by Takeshi Nakatsuka)
- "God Bless You" by Walküre (Episode 10 ending theme of Macross Delta. Composed by Katsutoshi Kitagawa.
- "Crosswalk" by Minori Suzuki (Second opening theme of Amanchu!. Composed by Katsutoshi Kitagawa)
- "Over and Over" by Yanagi Nagi (Opening theme of Just Because!. Composed by Katsutoshi Kitagawa)
- "Original" by TrySail (Opening theme of Interviews with Monster Girls. Composed by Mito)
- "Rocket Beat" by Kiyono Yasuno (Second opening theme of Cardcaptor Sakura: Clear Card Composed by Kitagawa Katsutoshi)
- "Dame wa Dame" by Minori Suzuki (Ending theme of Magical Sempai. Arranged by Katsutoshi Kitagawa)
- "Smile! Smile! Smile!" by Yuka Ozaki (Opening theme of Shōnen Ashibe Go! Go! Goma-chan. Composed by Katsutoshi Kitagawa)
- "Housekino Umareru Toki" by Yanagi Nagi (Opening theme of The Case Files of Jeweler Richard. Composed by Katsutoshi Kitagawa)
- "The Girls Are Alright!" by Saya (Opening theme of A Place Further than the Universe. Composed by Mito)
- "Don't Say Good Bye" by Nanako Mori (Ending theme of Buddy Daddies. Composed by Katsutoshi Kitagawa)
- "Hakka" by Konomi Suzuki (Ending theme of Ishura. Composed by Katsutoshi Kitagawa)
- "Haiiro" and "Intaglio" by Kana Hanazawa (Both ending theme of Dark Gathering. Composed by Katsutoshi Kitagawa)
- "Ballpark de Shake! Don't Shake!" by Ai Fairouz, Maaya Uchida, Ikumi Hasegawa, Momoko Seto and Mayu Sagara (Ending theme of Catch Me at the Ballpark!. Composed by Katsutoshi Kitagawa)
- "Dramatic Janakutemo" by Kana Hanazawa (Opening theme of Kubo Won't Let Me Be Invisible. Composed by Katsutoshi Kitagawa)
- "Bookmarks" by Sizuk and Harutya (Ending theme of Zatsu Tabi: That's Journey. Arranged by Katsutoshi Kitagawa)
- "Wakaba no Koro" by Natsumi Kiyoura (Ending theme of Wash It All Away. Composed by Katsutoshi Kitagawa)
