= Doctor of Letters =

Higher doctorate degree

A Doctor of Letters (D.Litt., Litt.D., Latin: Litterarum Doctor or Doctor Litterarum), also termed Doctor of Literature in some countries, is the holder of a terminal degree in the arts, humanities, and social sciences. In the United States, at universities such as Drew University, the degree awarded is for an "interdisciplinary" program of postgraduate study designed "with working professionals in mind." Depending on the country, the degree awarded may also be a higher doctorate after the Doctor of Philosophy (Ph.D.) degree or equivalent to a higher doctorate, such as that of Doctor of Science (Sc.D. or D.Sc.) or Doctor of Laws (LL.D). It is awarded in Argentina and Mexico by universities in recognition of superior accomplishment in the Arts, Social Sciences or humanities, such as original contributions to the creative or cultural arts, or scholarship in Social Sciences and humanities and other merits. or may be conferred as an earned higher doctorate by Universities in England or Canada after the submission and academic evaluation of a portfolio of sustained scholarship, publications, research, or other scientific work of the highest caliber.

In addition to being awarded as an earned degree, this doctorate is also conferred as an honoris causa to recognize one's lifetime of excellence in a particular humanistic, cultural, or artistic field, or other notable contributions to society. When conferred as an honorary doctorate, many or all of the standard degree requirements, including application, matriculation, coursework, doctoral dissertation or thesis, and portfolio evaluation may be waived, at the discretion of the degree-granting body. Honorary Doctor of Letters recipients need not necessarily have any previous affiliation with the awarding institution and, in most cases, it is not considered proper for awardees to use the title of "Dr." before their names. Universities, colleges, or learned bodies may award the honorary degree of Doctor of Letters, Doctor of Literature or the related Doctor of Humane Letters, to luminaries who have been identified as rare exemplars who have enriched the humanities in particular, or humanity at large. Mark Twain was awarded an honorary D.Litt. by Oxford University in 1907 for his literary contributions. Nelson Mandela was awarded honorary Doctor of Letters degrees by the University of Natal in 1993 and the Open University of Tanzania in 2000 for his leadership in the struggle against apartheid in South Africa.

== Britain, the Commonwealth and Ireland ==
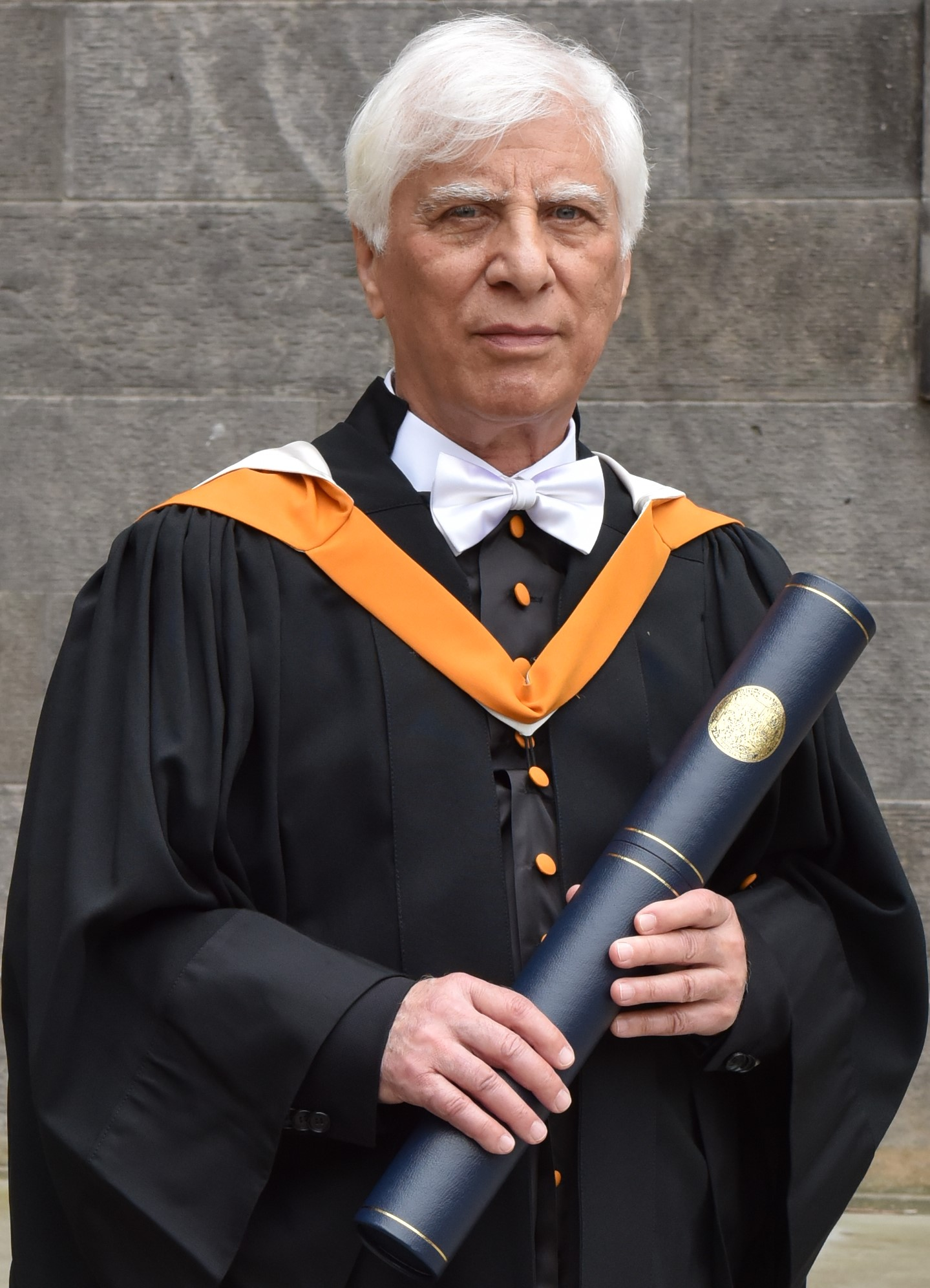
Bahram Beyzai, dressed in a traditional University of St. Andrews black cassock, having just received a D.Litt. honoris causa, June 2017

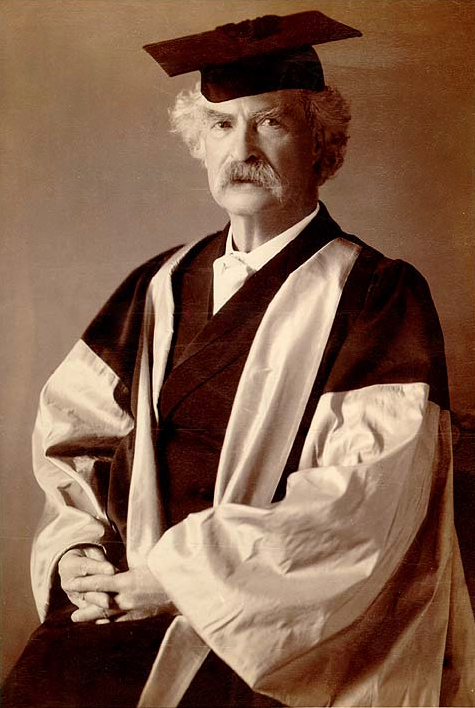
Mark Twain (right), wearing the full-dress gown of a University of Oxford Doctor of Letters. He was awarded an honorary doctorate of letters in 1907.

In the United Kingdom, Australia, India, and Ireland, the degree is a higher doctorate, above the Doctor of Philosophy (Ph.D.) or Doctor of Education (Ed.D.), for example, and is awarded on the basis of high achievement in the respective field or a long record of research and publication. The D.Litt. degree is awarded to candidates whose record of published work and research shows conspicuous ability and originality and constitutes a distinguished and sustained achievement. University committee and board approval is required, and candidates must provide documented mastery of a particular area or field. The degree may also be awarded honoris causa to such individuals as the awarding institution deems worthy of this highest academic award.

At the University of Oxford, the degree was established in 1900 as part of the development of graduate-level research degrees that began with the introduction of the B.Litt. and B.Sc. degrees in 1895. Until then, Oxford had focused on undergraduate teaching, with the doctorates, such as those in divinity (D.D.) and medicine (D.M.) traditionally reserved for established scholars. The German paradigm, adopted by the Americans, that created a demand for the philosophiae doctor (Ph.D.) degree as a basic qualification for an academic career, was not immediately adopted at Oxford, but it did create pressure for Oxford to offer a degree for this purpose. Rather than use the D.Litt. degree, Oxford eventually created its doctor of philosophy (D.Phil.) degree in 1915, deliberately using a distinctive English, rather than a Latin, title and abbreviation for it. The D.Phil. became an accelerated, supervised, degree of lower status than the D.Litt. When it was established in 1900, the Oxford Doctor of Literature (D.Litt.) degree could be awarded to individuals who had a standing of thirty-four terms from the award of a B.Litt. degree, or of thirty-nine terms (thirteen academic years) from the award of an Oxford master of arts M.A. degree, providing they could provide "fitness for the degree in published books or papers, containing an original contribution to the advancement of learning." The required number of terms changed over the years, depending on the prior Oxford degree that a candidate held, and the requirements became more specific.

By 2015, The Oxford University Examination Regulations called for a faculty board at Oxford to "appoint judges to consider the evidence submitted by any candidate, and to report thereon to the board. In making their report, the judges shall state whether the evidence submitted constitutes an original contribution to the advancement of knowledge of such substance and distinction as to give the candidate an authoritative status in some branch or branches of learning." Between 1923 and 2016, Oxford awarded 219 D.Litt. degrees, of which 196 were awarded to men and 23 to women. Among the six higher doctoral degrees at Oxford (D.D., D.M., D.C.L., D.Litt., D.Sc., D.Mus.), the D.Litt. comprised 27.5% of the higher doctorates awarded during this 93-year period.

In June 2016, the Oxford D.Litt. was suspended, pending a reform of the higher doctorates. The reforms were completed in June 2018 and applications reopened in September 2018.

Oxford's higher doctorates were again suspended from 2023; as currently projected until the end of the 2028 academic year. Whereas this suspension remains subject to review, Oxford's higher doctorates are deemed by the university as being 'suspended for the foreseeable future'.

The updated 2018 regulations reduced the number of higher doctorates to five by dropping the Doctor of Medicine as a higher doctorate. The standards for the remaining doctorates, including the D.Litt. (now also referred to as "Doctor of Letters" rather than Doctor of Literature), require the judges "to consider whether the evidence submitted demonstrates excellence in academic scholarship and is:

- a) of the absolute highest quality;
- b) substantial in scale and in the contribution it has made to knowledge;
- c) sustained over time and showing current and continued contribution to scholarship;
- d) authoritative, being able to demonstrate impact on the work of others;
- e) of global reach and international importance within the field; and
- f) of such breadth or covering such branches of knowledge appropriate to the field and in line with disciplinary norms and expectations."

== United States ==
In the United States, the degree may be conferred as an honorary degree or an earned degree.

Several American universities regularly award the honorary Doctor of Letters (D.Litt.) degree, including Harvard University, Columbia University, and Yale University, among others.

== France ==
In France, the doctorat is awarded with a speciality, but there is no official list of these. Candidates for a doctorat in literature are awarded a Doctorat ès lettres, abbreviated Dr ès l.

There is a higher degree, the Habilitation à diriger des recherches, which is obtained following different rules in each field. In literature, the candidates must also present a new and unpublished work. The habilitation (which is not followed by an indication of the field) allows holders to apply for a position of professor in French universities.

Before the 1950s, the now-abolished Doctorat d'État degree was called Doctorat ès lettres (in France, "letters" is equivalent to "humanities").

== India ==
In India the DLitt degree was earlier called the Doctor of Letters, but presently DLitt is an abbreviation of "Doctor of Literature" or Doctorate in Literature (D.Litt.), since the year 2014, after a Gazette Notification by the Government of India mandated a change in the nomenclature. The D.Litt. is the highest postdoctoral degree awarded in the fields of arts, humanities and social sciences. The DLitt may be "earned" through research in a public university, or bestowed as an honoris causa award for distinguished achievements. For an earned DLitt degree, the entry requirement is a Doctor of Philosophy degree and evidence of substantial contribution to the field after completion of PhD. The DLitt Thesis is expected to be of an exceptionally high order, and is reviewed by eminent experts in the subject. The new vistas of knowledge embodied in the DLitt Thesis must also be publicly defended. DLitt (honoris causa) are conferred by public universities, usually on visiting dignitaries or on experts who may or may not have the prescribed qualification, but have substantially contributed to academic or professional development of a field of knowledge.

The honorary DLitt are considered an award, and not an academic degree in the strictest sense. As an example, The World Human Rights Protection Commission (W.H.R.P.C.) confers the Doctorate in Literature(D.Litt.) in literature or Arts and Social Science.

Similarly, the highest educational degree at the postdoctoral level in Sanskrit, Pali, Prakrit, Indic religious studies, Oriental literature and Indology in India is termed Vidya Vachaspati, which is legally recognized as the equivalent to the DLitt.

Enrollment in a Vidya Vachaspati program generally requires both having published works and the previous attainment of a Vidya Vairidhi degree, which is equivalent to a PhD.

The title of Vidya Vachaspati may also be awarded honoris causa to distinguished scholars who may otherwise lack the educational qualifications to be eligible to register for the earned degree, but whose expertise and contributions are deemed to be deserving of the honour.

== See also ==
- Doctor of Liberal Arts
- Doctor of Liberal Studies
