= Scha Dara Parr =

Japanese hip-hop group

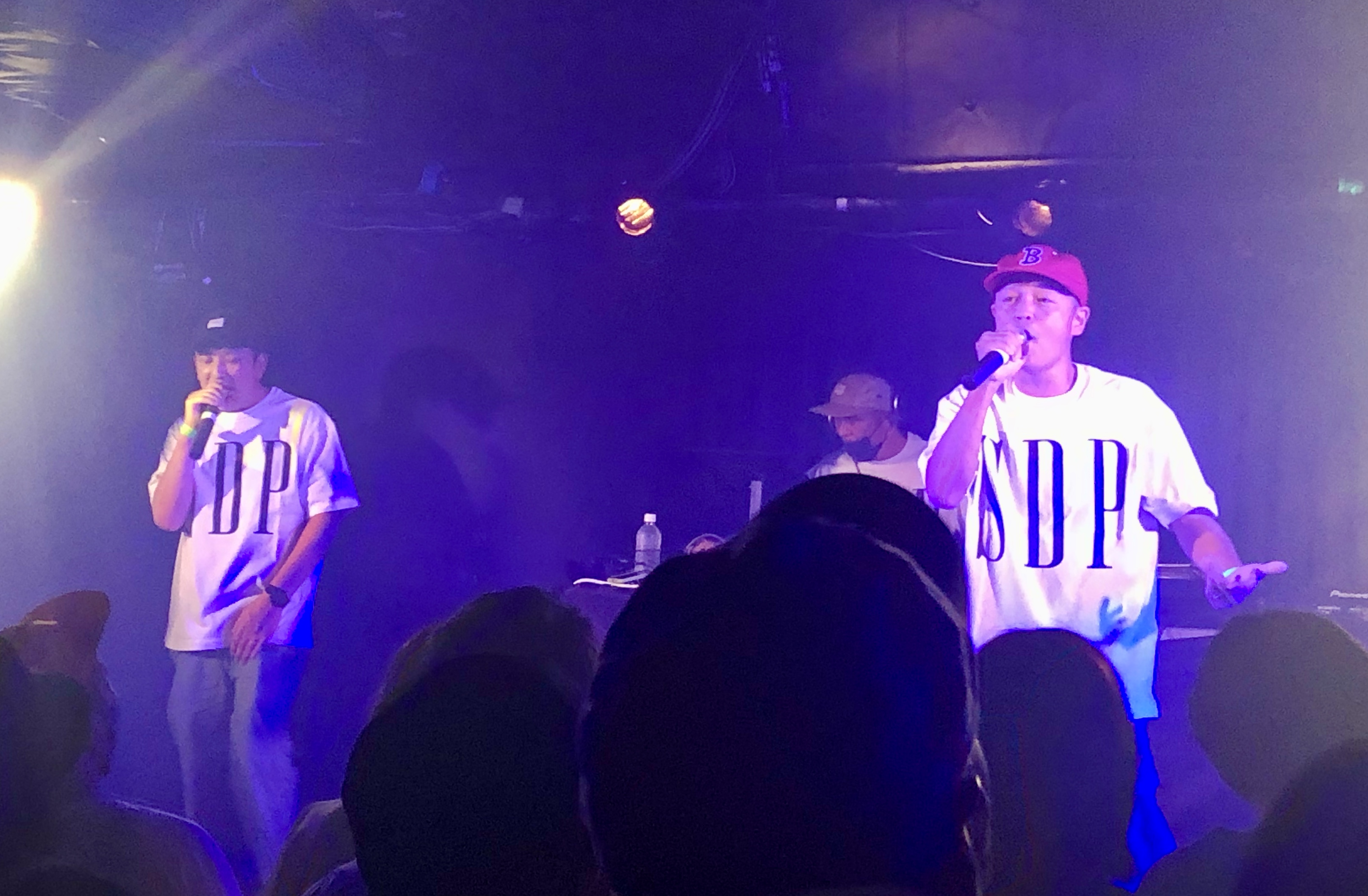
- Scha Dara Parr live in a Shibuya club in 2022

Background information
- Origin: Japan
- Genres: Hip-hop; J-pop
- Years active: 1988–present
- Labels: Major Force; File Records; Epic Records Japan; Ki/oon Records; EMI Music Japan; Warner Music Japan; Tearbridge Records; Space Shower Music
- Spinoffs: Scha Dara Parr Karano Rhymester
- Members: Ani; Bose; Shinco
- Website: Official website

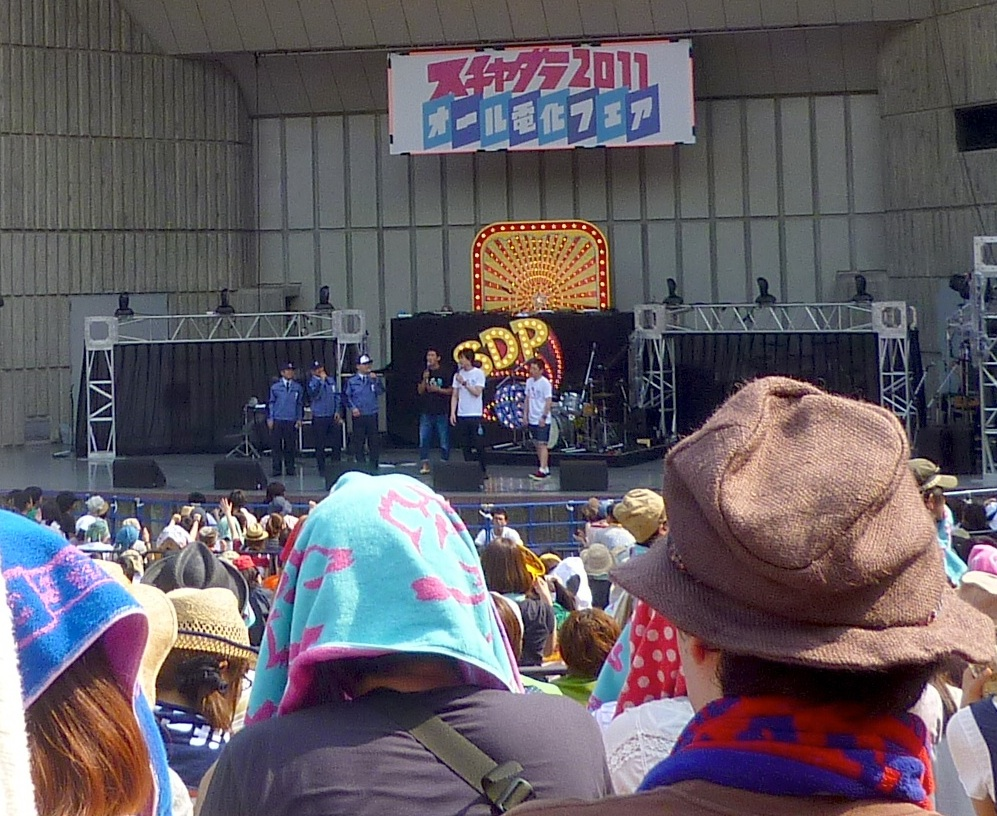
Scha Dara Parr live in 2011 (on the left in blue uniforms)

Scha Dara Parr (スチャダラパー, Suchadarapā), or SDP for short, is a three-member Japanese hip-hop group that formed in 1988 and debuted in 1990.

== History ==
The group consists of two MCs, Bose and Ani, and one DJ, Shinco. Scha Dara Parr is often compared to rap trio the Beastie Boys due to their similar lyrical stylings, presence, and music. When pushed to describe the rebelliousness of their music, the group commented that many of their songs are simply fragments of conversation without polite words.

The group is best known for their 1994 hit single, "Kon'ya wa Boogie-Back" (今夜はブギー・バック, Kon'ya wa Bugī Bakku) featuring Kenji Ozawa (小沢 健二), which attained sales of over 500,000 units. The song is based on samples from En Vogue's 1992 single, "Give It Up, Turn It Loose."

Scha Dara Parr gained minor US recognition by appearing on De La Soul's 1993 album, Buhloone Mindstate. The group rapped in a mixture of mostly Japanese and some English on the track "Long Island Wildin'".

The 1991 single "Game Boyz" (ゲームボーイズ) from the group's second album "Towering Nonsense" (タワリングナンセンス) was featured in the Japanese commercial for The Legend of Zelda: A Link to the Past. By the end of 2013, when The Legend of Zelda: A Link Between Worlds was released as a sequel to Link to the Past, Scha Dara Parr wrote a rap for a Japanese commercial for this game. This eventually became its own sequel-- "Game Boyz 2" (ゲームボーイズ 2), released on their album 1212 in 2015.

== Members ==
- Ani: Yōsuke Matsumoto (松本洋介) - MC
- Bose: Makoto Kōshima (光嶋誠) - MC
- Shinco: Shinsuke Matsumoto (松本真介) - DJ

== Discography ==
=== Studio albums ===
- Scha Dara Daisakusen (1990)
- Towering Nonsense (1991)
- Wild Fancy Alliance (1993)
- 5th Wheel 2 The Coach (1995)
- Gūzen no Album (1996)
- fun-key LP (1998)
- Docompact Disc (2000)
- The 9th Sense (2004)
- Con10po (2006)
- 11 (2009)
- 1212 (2015)

=== Extended plays ===
- Scha Dara Gaiden (1994)
- Anishinbou (2016)

=== Compilation albums ===
- Potent Hits ~Single Collection~ (1994)
- Toshiba Classic 95-97 (1998)
- CAN YOU COLLABORATE?~best collaboration songs&music clips (2008)
- Best of Schadaraparr 1990-2010 (2010)

=== Remix albums ===
- Cycle Hits ~remix Best Collection~ (1995)
