= Eloquentia perfecta =

Tradition of the Society of Jesus

Eloquentia perfecta, a tradition of the Society of Jesus, is a value of Jesuit rhetoric that revolves around cultivating a person as a whole, as one learns to speak and write for the common good. Eloquentia perfecta is a Latin term which means "perfect eloquence". The term connotes values of eloquent expression and action for the common good. For Jesuits, the term eloquentia perfecta was understood as the joining of knowledge and wisdom with virtue and morality.

== History ==
=== Origins in Greek rhetorical thought ===
Eloquentia was born, as a concept, in the rhetorical studies of ancient Greece. However, the term eloquentia perfecta was coined in 1599 with the Ratio Studiorum, which laid out the groundwork for Jesuit educational curriculum.

In classical Greek rhetorical thought the idea of a perfectly eloquent speaker was one who understood the subject matter they were speaking about in intimate detail, yet was able to communicate those same ideas in straightforward language that would be clearly understood by the listener they were addressing at the time. In Plato's dialogue the Phaedrus, Socrates states this idea that a speaker must craft their discourse dependent on the intended listener in order to most effectively communicate, instruct, or persuade that listener.

[277b] Socrates: A man must know the truth about all the particular things of which he speaks or writes, and must be able to define everything separately; then when he has defined them, he must know how to divide them by classes until further division is impossible; and in the same way he must understand the nature of the soul, [277c] must find out the class of speech adapted to each nature, and must arrange and adorn his discourse accordingly, offering to the complex soul elaborate and harmonious discourses, and simple talks to the simple soul. Until he has attained to all this, he will not be able to speak by the method of art, so far as speech can be controlled by method, either for purposes of instruction or of persuasion. This has been taught by our whole preceding discussion.

=== 1534–1599: The early Jesuit order and the first Jesuit school ===
The Jesuit order, or Society of Jesus, was founded in 1540 by Ignatius of Loyola (1491–1556) who was a Basque nobleman and soldier. After having his leg broken by a cannonball in battle, Ignatius spent time recovering and studying scripture. During his convalescence he underwent a spiritual awakening and decided to dedicate his life to serving God. He also decided that the best way to do this was to continue his education and join the clergy.

In 1534, while attending the University of Paris, Ignatius along with several of his classmates decided to commit themselves to the service of the Lord and took vows of poverty, chastity, and obedience to the Pope. They imagined themselves as soldiers of the Lord and named their order Compañía de Jesús or Company of Jesus. It was not until 1540 that the order was recognized by the Pope and officially formed as the Society of Jesus or Jesuit Order.

Education was not the original goal of the Jesuits. They had intended to work as missionaries to the Holy land, converting people to Christianity and saving souls. However, in an effort to compete with Christian Protestants and reformers in Europe a need was recognized by the Roman Catholic church for better educated clergy. Through the Council of Trent (1546–63) the Jesuits were called on by the Pope to help improve the education of clergy.

Ignatius and his six students took vows of poverty and chastity in an attempt to work for the conversion of Muslims. After being unable to travel to Jerusalem because of the Turkish wars, they went to Rome instead to meet with the pope and request permission to form a new religious order. In September 1540, Pope Paul III approved Ignatius’ outline of the Society of Jesus, and the Jesuit order was born. The Jesuits adhered to Ignatius's meditative practices, the Spiritual Exercises and centered their lives on active service rather than subdued monasticism. The Jesuit order played an important role in the Counter-Reformation and eventually succeeded in converting millions around the world to Catholicism. The Jesuit movement was founded in August 1534 by Ignatius de Loyola.

=== 1599–1773: Ratio Studiorum and expansion of Jesuit schools through Europe ===
Through the work in the school in Messina and other Jesuit colleges, the Jesuits began to formulate an approach to education that was formalized in a document titled the Ratio atque Institutio Studiorum Societatis Iesu (The Official Plan for Jesuit Education), or often shortened to Ratio Studiorum (Latin: Plan of Studies). The Ratio Studiorum provided the primary and static conventions for Jesuit teaching for 400 years. It was sufficient in outlining what should be strived for and the core values of Jesuit education.

This plan contained such revolutionary ideas as segregating students into smaller groups by their level or ability in a subject. The curriculum consisted heavily of study of classical subjects such as theology, philosophy, Latin and Greek. Jesuit institutions were enhanced by many influential mantras. Some of these phrases (and their direct translations) include Cura Personalis (care for the whole person), Magis (to do more), Nuestro Modo de Procedor (our way of proceeding), and Eloquentia Perfecta (perfect eloquence). The goal of the Ratio Studiorum was not only to educated better clergy but to also do God's work of improving the world by creating better educated and compassionate civic leaders.

Over the next two hundred years Jesuit schools spread through Europe and beyond. By 1599 there were 245 Jesuit colleges in operation. The growth continued until 1773, when it is estimated that the Jesuits operated over eight hundred separate schools, colleges, seminaries and universities across the globe.

=== 1773–1814: Suppression of the Jesuit order by Pope Clement XIV ===
In July 1773, the Jesuit order was suppressed by an order from Pope Clement XIV and all Jesuit colleges under Papal rule were closed indefinitely. Only schools located in Prussia remained open as Jesuits in Europe, the Americas, India, and Asia obeyed the orders of the Pope and closed the institutions.

=== 1814–1900: Restoration of the Jesuit order and founding of new colleges ===
In August 1814, the suppression of the Jesuit order was reversed. Following the restoration the Jesuit order founded several new universities and expanded into the United States of America. The Association of Jesuit Colleges and Universities (AJCU) began in 1789 when Georgetown University was founded in Washington, D.C. Saint Louis University, founded in 1818 in St. Louis, Missouri, is the second oldest Jesuit university in the United States.

=== 1900s: Translation of traditions into the modern perspective ===
The goal of education, being strengthening the students communication skills with leadership skills, emotions, and eloquence, remained. However, by the mid-20th century, the modern world called for adjustments to the curriculum. Vatican II, or the Second Vatican Council, took place from 1962 to 1965. After the council, members of the Jesuit academic world began taking into account the characteristics of a contemporary world that was evolving at a quick pace. The Society's new goal at this time was to consolidate the identity of Jesuit education, and to achieve this they sought out particular ways of teaching.

1975 saw a modern adaptation of the Society of Jesus' goals. For example, the traditional goals of the Society, which were set forth in 1540, were translated after the 32nd General Congregation of Jesuits held in Rome from 1974 to 1975. "Defense and propagation of the faith" turned into "service of faith and promotion of justice which it includes", and "salvation and protection of souls" became "total integration and liberation of man leading to participation in the life of God".

In 1986, the Jesuit Society released The Characteristics of Jesuit Education. This document set forth a concept for modern Jesuit education, which was reiterated in greater detail with the 1993 document Ignatian Pedagogy: A Practical Approach. These two documents, detailing the values of education and how to approach them in a classroom setting, set the stage for contemporary Jesuit education.

While the Ratio Studiorum description of rhetoric emphasized only oratory and poetry, today's Jesuit rhetorical education accepts the appreciation of multiple genres in different media These rhetoric classes promoted both useful skills and cultural enrichment. The classes combined general ideas and stylistic practices from Greco-Roman culture and joined these ideas with the learnings of the church.

== Education ==
=== Jesuit rhetoric ===
The phrase eloquentia perfecta was aimed to produce a Christian version of a classical ideal speaker, one who is good in writing and presenting for the common good. This has remained the Jesuit goal over the last three and a half centuries. Rhetoric can be described as the way one arranges and expresses a thought in a way to adapt and influence someone else's mind. Jesuit rhetoric is often presented with strong emotions. It is important to know what the perfect orator is also considering of the safety and welfare of the whole community and not only their own dignity. Jesuit schools aim to promote eloquentia perfecta by educating their students into ideal orators by incorporating critical thinking, civic responsibility, and ethics into a Jesuit rhetoric curriculum in colleges. Jesuit rhetoric has evolved from teaching, preaching, running missions, as well as hearing confessions. While their teachings have stayed fairly similar, Jesuits changed their phrasing which changed the most in order to be better heard by their followers.

In 1599, the Society of Jesus was presented with Ratio Studiorum, which included Jesuit educational framework and rules for the professors of rhetoric. Within this framework was the values of eloquentia perfecta which was, and continues to be, taught in Jesuit schools worldwide. Gert Beista, the author of The Beautiful Risk of Education, explains that there are three objectives to Jesuit rhetoric that focuses on "reconnecting with the question of purpose in education". The first is that Jesuit rhetoric provides students with the knowledge, skills, and judgment that enables them to do something within their current society such as training for real-world issues with eloquence. The second of the three objectives is socialization, about which Beista states: "Through education, we become members of and part of particular social, cultural and political orders." The last objective is what Beista likes to call subjectification. This term is characterized to be the opposite of socialization, in which its emphasis is on individualization and independence in one's thinking and actions.

Eloquentia perfecta is built on “the classical ideal of the good person writing and speaking well for the public good and promotes the teaching of eloquence combined with erudition and moral discernment. Developing this tradition in modern composition study and communication theory, the course of rhetorical art complements the other foundation courses with topics such as ethics and communication, virtue and authority, knowledge and social obligation.” In sum, the courses offered at a school with Jesuit values aim to foster critical thinking, moral reflection, and articulate expression. A Jesuit education centers itself around the goal to provide its students with “the ability to use speech and writing effectively, logically, gracefully, persuasively, and responsibly”.

American schools are trying to revitalize traditions for rhetoric in relation to core curriculum. There is a new focus on combining written and oral rhetoric, speaking and listening with writing and reading. Media is becoming the biggest way to receive messages across the world, but it is also one of the greatest mediators. Jesuit schools are also engaging literacy with other forms of expression such as the new digital revolution and new media technologies which are visual, aural, kinesthetic, and verbal.

=== Eloquentia perfecta in Jesuit colleges ===
After the American Civil War, non-Jesuit colleges began to differ in the curriculum. This divergence was due to the molding of non-Jesuit schools by the elective system, while Jesuit colleges conserved classical courses involving Greek and Latin literature. This however did not stick and there was a decline in the teachings of Latin especially. In 1814, there was an official restoration of the society which the phrase Eloquentia Perfecta lived through. A type of eloquence not often talked about is the heroic. This term combines human skill and divine inspiration which has come from informed thinking, moral discernment, and civic responsibility.

Steven Mailloux, a professor of rhetoric at Loyola Marymount University (LMU), concluded that "an optimal orator would combine written and oral language concepts such as morality or ethics and intelligence". This concept has expanded from education in Jesuit colleges and preaching this tradition and guiding Spiritual Exercises to courses in American colleges such as LMU, University of San Francisco, and Fordham University.

According to the dean of Fordham University in New York, Robert Grimes, eloquentia perfecta is composed of three characteristics—"the right use of reason ... to be able to express your thoughts into words ... [and] to [communicate] gracefully, that is, do it in a way so that people are willing to listen to what you say".

LMU's core curriculum provides a few aspects that construct eloquentia perfecta, the first being that it "incorporates the traditional mode of rhetoric through writing, reading, speaking, and listening". The second aspect is the "remediation of this form of rhetoric in terms of adapting to the information age and its digital elements".

Eloquentia Perfecta is a long-valued tradition of Jesuit education meaning “right reason expressed effectively, responsibly, and gracefully.” Jesuit schools find ways to incorporate these values into their core curriculum to help students develop skills in oral and written expression, which will serve them well in college and beyond. These courses also incorporate the Jesuit value of cura personalis; the caring for a whole person, to ensure that each student is valued as a unique and multifaceted individual.

The core curriculum at Fordham University now incorporates four eloquentia perfecta seminars, differing from other classes in their direct focus on written and oral skills of communication. Fordham is not the only Jesuit institution to begin experimenting ways to incorporate this concept into modern academics. Clarke notes that such institutions are doing so since "every 10 years or so most institutions take a hard look at the structure and emphasis of their core curriculum to see whether adjustments or even major restructuring is in order". Thus, eloquentia perfecta has been researched and incorporated much more recently, not that has been absent in Jesuit education completely, but the key term and attention to it has. In a sense, Jesuit institutions are beginning to explicitly teach eloquentia perfecta rather than implicitly. However, this concept will only continue to progress and change with the digital age, as students and the population as a whole have so many means of communication. It is the responsibility of the Jesuit institutions to uphold the concept and teachings of eloquentia perfecta, one that may even affirm the Jesuit identity among these institutions. Although Jesuit rhetoric promotes the study of eloquentia perfecta, by 20th midcentury in the United States, Jesuit rhetorical studies differed little in comparison to rhetorical studies in non-Jesuit Schools. This is due to the similarity of the fundamental study of Aristotle, Cicero, and Quintilian.

With the advancements of Jesuit rhetoric, Jesuit colleges introduced three important rhetorics written by Jesuits. These three rhetorics included Ars Dicendi by German Jesuit Joseph Kleutgen, A Practical Introduction to English Rhetoric, and The Art of Oratorical Composition, both written by a Belgian-born Jesuit, Charles Coppens. Coppens taught at multiple American Jesuit colleges including the Jesuit seminary St. Stanislaus in Florissant, Missouri. He defines the three terms rhetoric, oratory, and eloquence. Coppens states that rhetoric is "the art of inventing, arranging, and expressing thought in a manner adapted to influence or control the minds and wills of others". He defines oratory as "the branch of rhetoric which expresses through orally". Lastly, he defines eloquence as "the expression or utterance of strong emotion in a manner adapted to excite correspondent emotions in others".

=== Ignatian pedagogy ===
The eloquentia-based Ignatian pedagogy is aimed at educating the whole person. They integrate eloquence and critical thinking with moral discernment. Teaching methods and content that is being put out should be modeled on the institutional embeddedness of the first Jesuit ministries which were created after the Second Vatican Council with their emphasis on verbal dialogue and written conversation. Schools should strive to encompass what makes Jesuit education distinctive and incorporate rhetoric tradition in all historically rich aspects. True eloquence was thought to only exist when one was the perfect orator as the good person speaking well.

== Modern times ==
=== Contemporary reach of Eloquentia perfecta ===
As John Callahan, S.J. says in his essay Jesuits and Jesuit Education, “no longer is Jesuit education the exclusive property of Jesuits. Rather, Jesuits and Jesuit education is the property of all the men and women who work in educational institutions which claim the Ignation heritage.” While Jesuit institutions and their corresponding eloquentia perfecta rhetorics have grown in the United States and worldwide, the number of active Jesuit individuals has dropped over the past fifty years, going from 36,000 in the 1960s to approximately 19,000 in 2013 (with many of those 19,000 being in retirement age). Many of these modern Jesuits do their work through Jesuit ministries and other social justice organizations worldwide, with only 5.8% of Jesuit-school faculty and staff directly belonging to the Jesuit community.

=== Adaptation to rhetorical changes in eloquentia perfecta ===
Many scholars might have the assumption that the original traditions of eloquentia perfecta have been erased in the later century, both through religious and academic teachings. However, though the term has been altered to fit modern society communication, the traditional teachings of the topic are very much alive. Through both digital technology and verbal communication, eloquentia perfecta continues to carry on the original goal of rhetorical eloquence to spread justice to all. Many of the Jesuit scholars have had to really adapt to new medians of expression and constantly have to recreate lesson plans for students to adapt to current societal standards. As stated by Morgan T. Reitmeyer and Susan A. Sci in their article "How To Talk Ethically: Cultivating the Digital Citizen through Eloquentia Perfecta": "News is no longer something to simply consume; rather it is something to which we are compelled to respond within a wide array of media."

=== Eloquentia perfecta in the digital age ===
According to Cinthia Gannett, many universities have integrated eloquentia perfecta at all tiers of their institutions. She further adds that several universities are revising their Core curriculums to include aspects of eloquentia perfecta tied in with digital literacy and communication. Specifically, Gannett highlights the everchanging new technologies, and how to navigate them in the space of higher education.

Many Jesuit-affiliated universities have created a required course for all incoming first year students to take eloquentia perfecta. Today there are means for people to share their voices publicly using all different types of technology. Many of the digital platforms (i.e. Snapchat, Twitter, and Instagram) allow people to integrate their personal insight and moral judgments to their followers. There are many famous people who use their public voice on these platforms in society to relay eloquent, justice-based messages. Many of these messages relate to real-life issues within different cultures around the world.

== People ==
=== People of the past ===
Cicero (106 BC – 43 BC) was a prominent rhetorician, philosopher, lawyer, and is considered the most notable of the Roman orators. When Cicero was twenty years old, he wrote De Inventione, a document that encapsulates the characteristics of first-century BC rhetoric. He believed that the perfect orator should speak eloquently and with dignity, and his ideals molded the values of eloquentia perfecta in Jesuit education.

Marcus Fabius Quintilianus, also known as Quintilian, was an ancient Roman philosopher, orator, rhetorician who lived from 35 A.D. to 95 A.D. Quintilian embodied eloquentia perfecta with his philosophical work on rhetoric titled Institutio Oratoria. The Institutio Oratoria was a piece advocating for a return to simpler language after a trend of highly embellished rhetoric spread across the Roman Empire. Quintilian laid the groundwork for the core value of eloquentia perfecta that states that the perfect speaker should be able to communicate in ways that are easy to understand.

Cyprian Soarez synthesized the rhetorical theories of Cicero, Aristotle, and Quintilian in his rhetorical textbook titled De arte rhetorica. In this work, Soarez called for combining Christian morality with non-religious learning.

Nicolas Caussin was a French Jesuit who theorized that there were three types of eloquence: human, divine, and heroic. These three distinguished types of eloquence each carry unique qualities. Caussin said that human eloquence is natural and admirable. Divine eloquence could be carried out by divine figures such as St. Paul and Isaiah. Caussin stated, "In this incident appears how weak and meager is human eloquence, compared with the divine ... Paul demolished the machinations of that rhetorician with a crushing blow of the spirit." Heroic eloquence is a combination of "human skill and divine inspiration."

=== People of modern times ===
Father Pedro Arrupe made the assertion that all students must become people of the world who help people to truly reach the fundamental goal of academic Jesuit teachings. He meant this in a rhetorical and philosophical way and not only referred to pure Jesuit practice. Women and men should be serving others to truly reach the Jesuit-practice goals.

Jeannie Gaffigan is a writer, actress, and Catholic comedian who exemplifies values of eloquentia perfecta in her work and life. Gaffigan was awarded the Inaugural Eloquentia Perfecta Award from Fordham's Graduate School of Religion and Religious Education (GRE) and the Paulist Press in October 2016. The award was given to Gaffigan because of her constant dedication to capturing the core significance of humanity. As a public figure, and social activist, she shines light on the idea that humanity is full of flaws that must be addressed. She bases her career on bringing people from all over the world together through skepticism, errors and uncertainty. As she receives much of her inspiration through Catholic religion, one of her most inspirational quotes to live by is by St. Ignatius of Loyola, founder of Society of Jesus, which reads, "Love ought to manifest itself in deeds rather than in words", and spreads this faith through her many social platforms.

Cinthia Gannett is a prominent educator who has taught and written about eloquentia perfecta throughout her career. Through her works and teaching, she intertwines traditional values of eloquentia perfecta with 21st century perspective.

== See also ==
- Cura personalis
- Digital rhetoric
- Magis
- Spiritual Exercises of Ignatius of Loyola
