= Akiba-kei =

Japanese slang term for Akihabara style

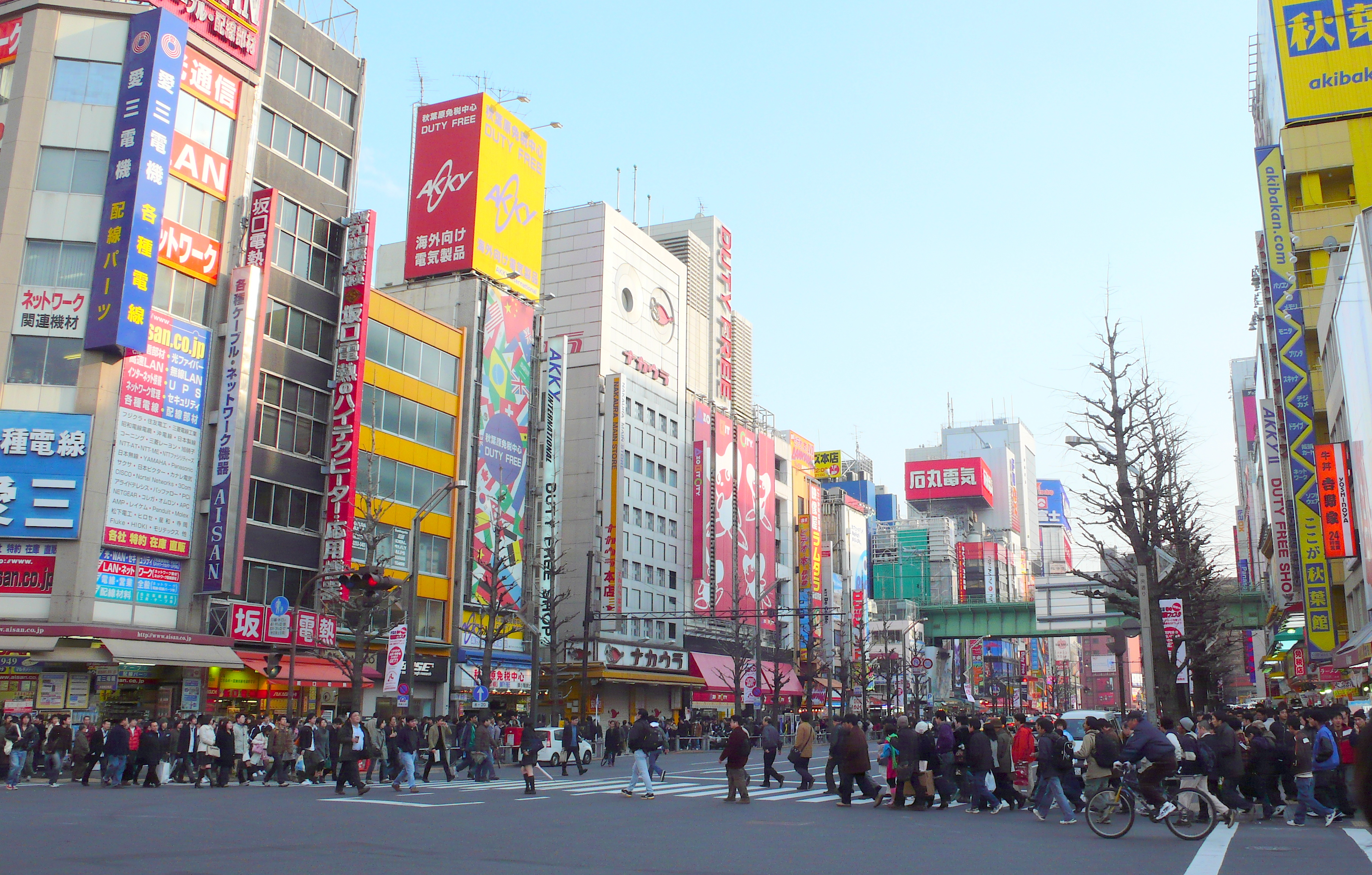
Akihabara in 2007

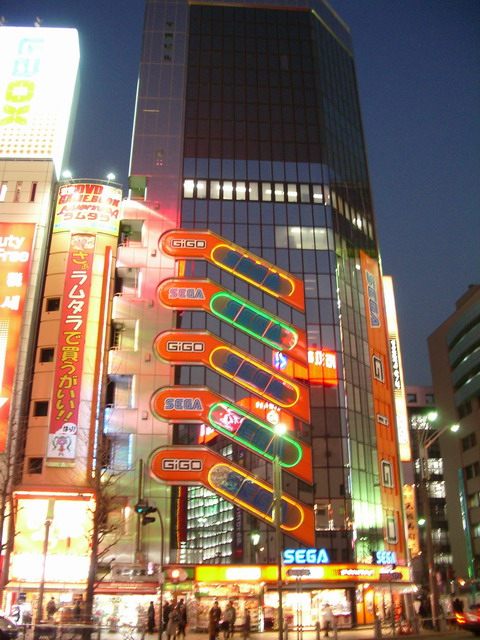
GiGO, a large Sega game center in Akihabara

Akiba-kei (Japanese: 秋葉系) or Akiba-chan (アキバちゃん) is a Japanese slang term for Akihabara style. Akihabara is a district in Chiyoda, Tokyo. It is a prominent gathering place for dedicated fans of manga, anime, video games, and idols.

== Definition ==
Akiba-kei is a Japanese slang term meaning "Akihabara style". It dates back to the early 1980s and refers to a subculture of otaku that spends a significant amount of time in and around the Akihabara area of Tokyo and is known for their strong interest in manga, anime, video games, idols, and maids. Akiba-kei has also been characterized as being "interested in ruminating about domestic items and creating fan works based on these existing elements."

== Location ==
The Akihabara area in central Tokyo is known as a marketplace of technology. It has ties to the Japanese video game industry, as well as to manga and anime publishers.

Akiba-kei frequently open their own shops in Akihabara and operate most of them in cosplay attire. Such attire is considered by some Akiba-kei to be the rule rather than the exception. The shops may sell model or ornamental weaponry, quirky or innovative foodstuffs, or serve as antique reading rooms. Mogra—a nightclub specializing in music associated with anime and video game subcultures—is also located in Akihabara.

== In popular culture ==
Within Japan's larger popular culture, Akiba-kei, for the most part, belong to an older generation well-versed in the history of Akihabara before it ever became a center of pop culture. Some of them, affectionately known as "Akiba historians", have worked in and around the Akihabara area for decades and witnessed firsthand the changes the area went through. In addition to running shops and participating in Akiba-kei culture, they may also be fonts of knowledge about Akihabara and its environs.

In early 2008, a project was undertaken to attempt to merge some aspects of Akiba-kei culture with Shibuya-kei, Japan's "super-chic internationalist music, fashion, interior, and design movement" that began in Japan in the 1990s. This came to be known as Akishibu-kei. In writing about this project, W. David Marx of Diamond Agency's culture blog observed:

Instead of fighting technological change, Akiba-kei otaku skillfully use the internet as a way to discuss and consecrate their favorite cultural items and disseminate new works to their community. This has only made the subculture stronger. In the end, the Akiba-kei subculture has won a top spot in the contemporary pop landscape because its culture has been least affected by the last decade's democratization of media and the decline in the culture markets.

=== Akiba-kei idol ===
Akiba-kei idols are Japanese idol performers associated with the subcultural aesthetics and interests linked to the Akihabara district. The style is generally connected to early underground idol activities influenced by Aoi Mizuno.

In the 1990s, Akihabara developed into a commercial and cultural hub for male-oriented otaku interests. A small number of female performers and enthusiasts also emerged during this period, including Haruko Momoi and Aoi Mizuno. Mizuno began her underground idol career by cosplaying as Shiori Fujisaki from Tokimeki Memorial. Momoi, who began activities in 1996, is widely regarded as one of the earliest identifiable Akiba-kei idols.

Other entertainers later associated with the Akiba-kei label include television personality Shoko Nakagawa, who began her career in 2001. The idol group AKB48, one of Japan's best-selling contemporary music acts, operates its own theater in Akihabara, from which its name is derived. The group Dempagumi.inc, formed in 2009, is composed of members who publicly identify as otaku of various genres.

As otaku culture has become increasingly mainstream, the use of the term "Akiba-kei" has declined, and some performers previously identified with the style have broadened their activities beyond the original subculture.

== See also ==
- Geek chic
- Hikikomori
- Otaku
