= Bachelor of Arts =

Type of undergraduate qualification

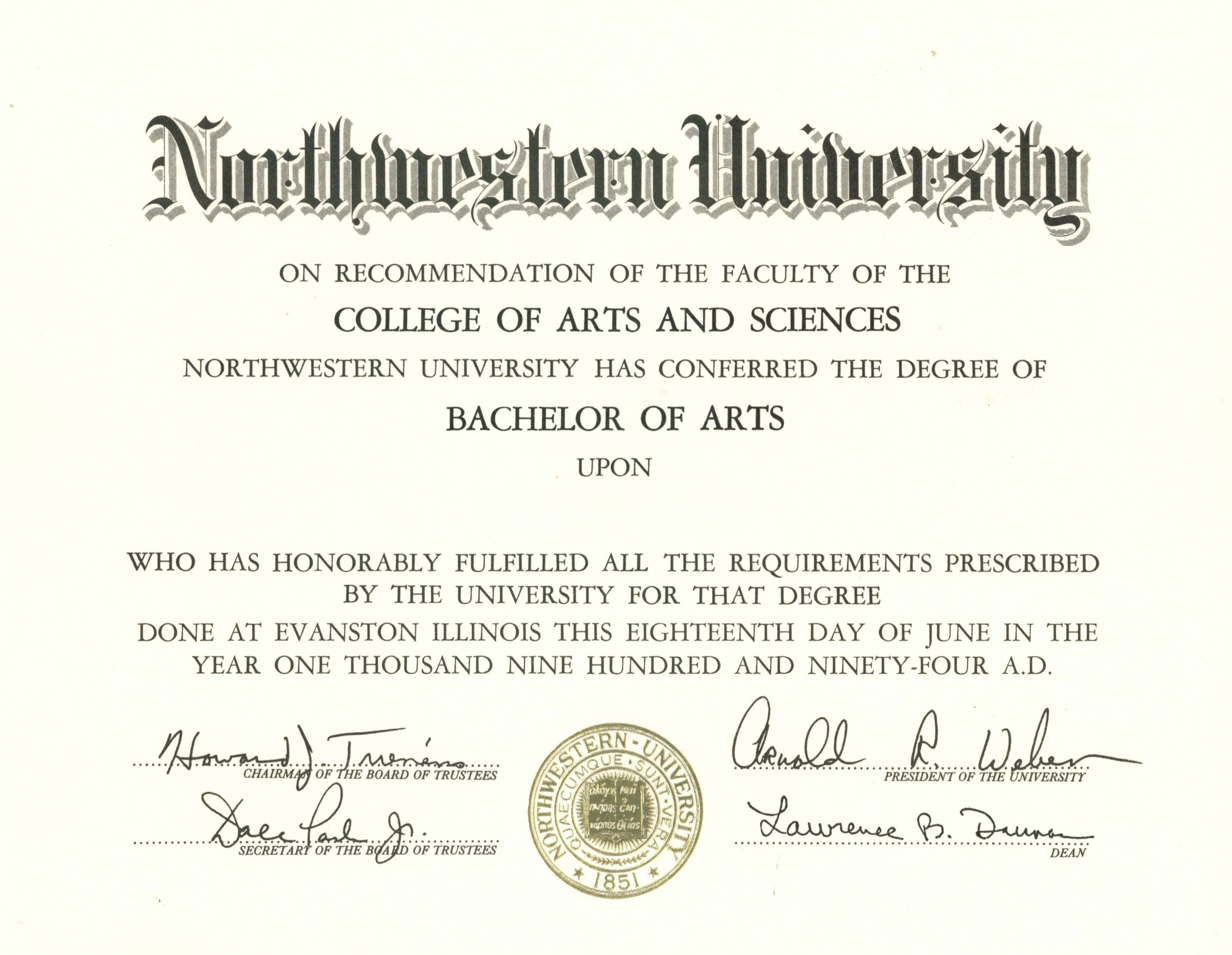
- A Bachelor of Arts degree from Northwestern University
- Acronym: BA; AB
- Type: Bachelor's degree
- Duration: Three or four years, depending on the country

A Bachelor of Arts (abbreviated BA or AB; from the Latin baccalaureus artium, baccalaureus in artibus, or artium baccalaureus) is the holder of a bachelor's degree awarded for an undergraduate programme in the liberal arts, or, in some cases, other disciplines.

A Bachelor of Arts degree course is generally completed in three, (Note: Degree attainment typically takes three years in Albania, Algeria, Australia, Austria, Bosnia and Herzegovina, Croatia, Cyprus, Denmark, Estonia, France, Germany, Iceland, India, Israel, Italy, Luxembourg, Malta, Mauritius, Montenegro, Morocco, New Zealand, Norway, Poland, Portugal, the Canadian province of Quebec, South Africa (certain degrees), Switzerland, Tunisia and the United Kingdom (except Scotland). In Bangladesh, China, Indonesia, Nigeria, Pakistan, and Russia, three-year BA (associates) courses are also available.) (Note: A three-year bachelor's degree usually does not qualify the holder for admission to graduate programs in other countries where four-year bachelor's degrees are the standard prerequisite.) four, (Note: Degree attainment typically takes four years in Afghanistan, Angola, Armenia, Azerbaijan, Bangladesh, Belarus, Belgium, Bhutan, Botswana, Brunei, Bulgaria, Burundi, Canada (except Quebec), China, Cuba, the Czech Republic, the Democratic Republic of the Congo, Djibouti, Egypt, El Salvador, Eritrea, Ethiopia, Finland, Gabon, Georgia, Ghana, Greece, Guatemala, Hong Kong, Hungary, Iceland, Indonesia, Iran, Iraq, Ireland, Jamaica, Japan, Kazakhstan, Kenya, Kuwait, Kyrgyzstan, Latvia, Lebanon, Liberia, Libya, Lithuania, Madagascar, Malaysia, Maldives, Mexico, Moldova, Mongolia, Mozambique, Myanmar, Namibia, Nepal, the Netherlands, Nigeria, North Korea, Oman, Pakistan, Panama, Papua New Guinea, the Philippines, Qatar, the Republic of the Congo, Romania, Russia, Rwanda, Saudi Arabia, Scotland, Senegal, Serbia, Singapore, Slovakia, Slovenia, South Africa, South Korea, Spain, Sri Lanka, Sweden, Syria, Taiwan, Tajikistan, Thailand, Turkey, Turkmenistan, Ukraine, the United Arab Emirates, the United States, Uzbekistan, Vietnam, Yemen, Zambia and Zimbabwe.) or five years or more, (Note: Degree attainment typically takes five or more years in Argentina, Bolivia, Brazil, Chile, Ecuador, Paraguay, Peru, Uruguay and Venezuela.) depending on the country and institution.

== Definition ==
The Bachelor of Arts (BA) degree is an undergraduate postsecondary degree that puts a focus on liberal arts and studies. In comparison, a Bachelor of Science (BS or BSc) has a greater focus on science, maths, and engineering. The Bachelor of Arts degree is a type of baccalaureate degree. A Bachelor of Arts degree is usually completed in four years: that is, it requires four years of full-time coursework during term time. However, just as with other degrees, some may require a longer time period. This is due to factors such as the student's ability, motivation, and access to financial assistance to earn the degree. Just like other baccalaureate degrees, a Bachelor of Arts is historically offered only at public and private universities and colleges. A Bachelor of Arts, just like other bachelor's degrees, is an admission requirement for graduate and professional school. Beginning in the 1990s, junior colleges started to confer their own baccalaureate degrees. In addition to the standard BA degrees, there are career-specific Bachelors of Arts degree, including Bachelor of Arts in Functional English, Bachelor of Arts in Administration, Bachelor of Arts in Interdisciplinary Studies, and Regents Bachelor of Arts.

== History ==
The Bachelor of Arts degree has been prominent in academics for centuries. It influenced universities to begin focusing on broad topics such as algebra, psychology, biology, art, history, and philosophy.

This aspect of the BA degree has been consistent in its history. The Bachelor of Arts degree was formed out of the study of liberal arts. Liberal art is a term that was applied to the study of many branches of learning such as grammar, logic, rhetoric, arithmetic, geometry, astronomy, and music. The study of liberal arts started during the Middle Ages. During the Renaissance, the term liberal art was meant to describe general studies more broadly. This definition of liberal studies remains to this day.

In Japan and the United States, Bachelor of Arts degrees were historically given only by public or private institutions and colleges.

== Degrees in Europe ==
=== Germany ===
In Germany, university-level education usually happens in either a Universität (plural: Universitäten) or a Fachhochschule (plural: Fachhochschulen); both can be referred to as a Hochschule, which is the generic term in Germany for all institutions awarding academic degrees. Fachhochschule is often translated as "University of Applied Sciences". Universitäten place greater emphasis on fundamental science and background in theory, while Fachhochschulen are generally designed with a focus on teaching professional skills. Degrees earned at Universitäten and Fachhochschulen are legally equivalent.

In Germany, the BA course normally lasts between three and three and a half years—six or seven semesters—and the degree is awarded after the student earns between 180 and 210 ECTS.

=== Netherlands ===
In the Netherlands, the BA and Master of Arts (MA) degrees were introduced in 2002. Until then, a single program led to the doctorandus degree (abbreviated drs.), which comprised the same course load as the bachelor's and master's programs combined. The title doctorandus was used in almost all fields of study; other titles were used for legal studies (meester, Dutch for master, abbreviated Mr.) and engineering (ingenieur, abbreviated Ir. for academic masters level or ING. for higher vocational bachelor's level). Those who had already started the doctorandus program could, on completing it, opt for the doctorandus degree (entitling them to use "drs." in front of their name) or could use the master's degree (post-nominal letters) in accordance with the new standard. When attaining a master level/graduate degree, it is still customary to use either drs. pre-nominally or MA/MSc post-nominally at the discretion of the holder.

=== United Kingdom and Ireland ===
In the United Kingdom (excluding Scotland) and Ireland, the first degree course normally lasts three years, but nomenclature varies: 19th-century and later universities usually distinguish between arts and sciences subjects by awarding either a BA or BSc degree. However, some older or ancient universities, such as the University of Oxford, University of Cambridge, and Trinity College Dublin traditionally award BAs to undergraduates having completed the final examinations, e.g., Part II Tripos (Cambridge), Final Honour Schools (Oxford), Moderator-ship (Dublin), in most subjects including the sciences. Some new plate glass universities established in the 1960s, such as York and Lancaster, originally followed the practice of Oxford and Cambridge by awarding BAs in all subjects, but have since changed to awarding BSc degrees in science subjects. At Oxford, Cambridge, and Dublin the degree of MA can be claimed, usually twenty-one terms after matriculation, without any further study. For many centuries, the bachelor's degree was an intermediate step and was awarded for much of the work carried out in later times at secondary schools. The names of the final secondary school exams in France and Spain (and of the International Baccalaureate) come from this: le Baccalauréat and el Bachillerato, respectively.

The ancient universities of Scotland award a Master of Arts degree to humanities or arts graduates, but a BSc to science graduates. This course takes four years for an honours degree and three for an ordinary. In Scotland, one can opt to take an ordinary degree, which ranks below a third class honours degree (for example, BA with distinction, merit or pass).

A Bachelor of Arts is entitled to the post-nominal letters BA for an ordinary or pass degree and BA (Hons) for an honours degree. The academic dress worn by honours and non-honours graduates is identical. An honours degree is always awarded in one of four classes, depending upon the marks gained in the final assessments and examinations. The top students are awarded a first-class degree, followed by an upper second-class degree (usually referred to as a 2:1), a lower second-class degree (usually referred to as a 2:2), and those who pass with the lowest marks gain a third-class degree. An ordinary, pass or unclassified degree (which does not give the graduate the right to add "Hons") may be awarded if a student has completed (i) followed a non-honours program, or (b) attempted an honours course but marginally failed to achieve third-class standard.

== Degrees in North America ==
=== Canada ===
Education in Canada is controlled by the provinces and can be very different depending on the province. While all Canadian universities offer four-year degrees, it is not uncommon, depending on the province and the university for a three-year general degree to also be offered as an option. In many universities and colleges, Bachelor of Arts degrees are differentiated either as BA or as honours BA degrees. Honours programs require more education than non-honours programs, typically a specialization beyond the requirements of a BA, and can sometimes be used as a gateway to a PhD program, bypassing a master's degree.

In Québec, BA degrees generally last three years, because the fourth year is replaced by CEGEP education (which fills the gap between Secondary V, the last year of high school, and the first year of university). However, four-year programs exist for students having completed 12 (instead of 13) years of education prior to being admitted to university.

=== United States ===
Along with the Bachelor of Science (BS), the Bachelor of Arts (BA) is the most commonly granted degree in the United States. A BA degree is usually earned after the completion of four years of undergraduate college level study.

Some universities in the United States abbreviate the degree as "AB" or "A.B.", derived from the Latin title Artium Baccalaureatus. AB degrees are particularly associated with Ivy League institutions and other universities with historical ties to Latin academic traditions—such as Harvard, Princeton, Brown, the University of Chicago, WashU, and Bryn Mawr College. These schools use the AB (or A.B.) designation to distinguish their degree from the more common Bachelor of Arts (BA). The use of Latin terminology underscores their heritage and the prestige of their academic programs, where the study of Greek and Latin had traditionally been a fundamental component of the undergraduate curriculum at these institutions. The College of Charleston also offers the A.B. degree as an option with the requirement that students demonstrate proficiency in either Latin or Greek.

== Degrees in other countries ==
In colleges and universities in Australia, Nepal, New Zealand, India and South Africa, the BA degree can be taken over three years of full-time study. Students must pursue at least one major area of study and units from that subject are usually studied in each year, though sometimes students may choose to complete upper-level classes in the same year and as a result, can leave space for elective subjects from a different field. At some universities, students may choose to pursue a second major; alternatively, the remainder of the degree is taken up with a minor area of study (in the first two years) and other individual or stream-based subjects.

=== India ===
Historically, BA in India was a three-year course. However, as per the changes implemented in National Education Policy 2020, BA is now a four-year degree program with multiple entry and exit options. Students who exit the program after three years are awarded a BA degree, whereas students who complete all four years are awarded either a BA (Hons.) or BA (Hons. with Research) degree.

=== Pakistan ===
In Pakistan, the Bachelor of Arts (BA) program used to be regular 2-year degree program in which students were offered with a combination of any two of areas from the available electives: Business, Journalism, Psychology, Computer Science and Education. However, now all bachelor's degree courses are 4-year program. 2 years degree is now called associate degree.

== See also ==
- Associate of Arts
- Bachelor of Applied Arts
- Bachelor of Business Administration
- Bachelor of Fine Arts
- Bachelor of Independent Studies
- Bachelor of Science
- Educational attainment in the United States
- Lady Literate in Arts
- Master of Arts
