= Flipper's Guitar =

Japanese band (1987–1991)

Background information
- Also known as: フリッパーズ・ギター; Lollipop Sonic; Double Knockout Corporation
- Origin: Tokyo, Japan
- Genres: Shibuya-kei; alternative rock; indie pop
- Years active: 1987–1991
- Label: Polystar
- Past members: Keigo Oyamada; Kenji Ozawa; Shusaku Yoshida; Yasunobu Arakawa; Yukiko Inoue

Flipper's Guitar (フリッパーズ・ギター) was a Tokyo-based indie pop band led by (and later a duo of) Keigo Oyamada and Kenji Ozawa. The band was influenced by the chirpy sound of British '80s pop and new wave/post-punk groups like Haircut 100, Exhibit B, Orange Juice, the Style Council and Aztec Camera, as well as the fashionably eclectic sounds of early '90s Britain, from alternative dance to acid jazz.

The group was an important part of the Tokyo Shibuya-kei scene in the late 1980s to early 1990s, and Oyamada went on to produce work for Pizzicato Five and his close friend Kahimi Karie.

The band wears their influence on their sleeves, their song titles often citing their British artists' influence — "Goodbye Our Pastels Badges", "Haircut One Hundred", "The Colourfield", etc.

Following the demise of the band in 1991, the two members pursued solo careers. Ozawa released the album The Dogs Bark But the Caravan Moves On under his own name, and Oyamada began recording under the name of Cornelius. It was as Cornelius that Oyamada gained a minor cult following outside Japan, as well as remix work for the likes of Blur, Beck, and the Manic Street Preachers.

== History ==
=== Lollipop Sonic and formation (1987–1988) ===
Flipper's Guitar formed in 1987 and were originally known as Lollipop Sonic. The group formed in junior high school as a five-piece consisting of Keigo Oyamada (vocals, guitar), Kenji Ozawa (guitar, vocals), Shusaku Yoshida (bass), Yasunobu Arakawa (drums) and Yukiko Inoue (keyboards). This early line-up lasted until early 1990 when Yoshida, Arakawa and Inoue were asked to leave.

In 1988, prior to signing with Polystar records, the group released material on a pair of independent cassettes. The first Favorite Shirts, the title is a reference to Haircut One Hundred's song of the same name, was a self-released 11-track cassette. The majority of the songs were re-recorded for the release the following year as the band's debut album. The second cassette, Akko-Chan's Anorak Party!, was a split-compilation that also included songs by the obscure Japanese groups; Penny Arcade and Debonaire. Some of Lollipop Sonic's tracks had already appeared on Favorite Shirt.

=== Three Cheers for Our Side (1989) ===
The group was 'discovered' by Zin Yoshida of the cult-Japanese new wave duo Salon Music. In 1989, Yoshida helped arrange for the group to sign with the major-record label Polystar. At the behest of their label the group renamed themselves Flipper's Guitar, a reference to the dolphins on the cover of the Orange Juice album You Can't Hide Your Love Forever. Still a five-piece they re-recorded the majority of their early material for release as their debut album. The album was produced by Zin N. Summer (a.k.a. Zin Yoshida), Hitomi T. (a.k.a. Hitomi Takenaka) (also of Salon Music) and Kenichi Makimura. Lead guitarist Ozawa wrote the lyrics for all songs. Music was written by Oyamada and Ozawa with arrangements by the band, Zin N. Summer and Hitomi T.

The resulting album Three Cheers for Our Side (海へ行くつもりじゃなかった), the title a homage to an Orange Juice song, was released in August 1989. While a fairly straightforward guitar-pop album, it showcased a wide array of sounds including elements of bossa nova, beach rock, and jazz. The group's fascination with European-style, British 80s guitar pop ("Goodbye, Our Pastels Badges") and American 60s pop (Lou Reed name-checked in the credits) was already evident. The album was sung entirely in English. The artwork, aside from lyric and song-title translations, were also displayed in English, and featured a comic strip by cartoonist Jonathan Lemon. Despite having major-label distribution the album was not a commercial success in Japan.

=== Camera Talk (1990) ===
1990 was a major year for the group. The group, now a duo, released several singles and their landmark second album. The first small coup for the duo came when their first single of the year "Friends Again" was featured in the film Octopus Army ~ Shibuya de aitai! This gave the group a lot of exposure to audiences outside of the small alternative scene. The single was also their first material produced by Oyamada and Ozawa themselves under the name Double Knockout Corporation. KO being Oyamada and Ozawa's initials. The single also marked the beginning of their contact with the European music scene. The group filmed the music video for "Friends Again" in France. Flipper's Guitar's second album Camera Talk, released later that year, credits French and English recording studios as well as British musicians John "Segs" Jennings (from The Ruts/Ruts DC) and David Ruffy (The Ruts, Aztec Camera) on several tracks.

In Japan, a major breakthrough came when their second single of 1990, the jazz-influenced "Young, Alive, In Love" was featured as the main theme song to the popular drama Youbikou Bugi (Cram-school Boogie). Aside from the extra exposure the decision to sing in Japanese marked a turning-point for the duo. All subsequent Flipper's Guitar songs were written in Japanese with occasional choruses adopting English. Due to the sudden uplift in popularity the group's second album Camera Talk (カメラ・トーク) was released in June 1990 to much greater anticipation and sales. The album produced by 'Double Knockout Corporation' and Zin Yoshida. The album shows the group widening its guitar-orientated sound to take-in bossa nova/Latin, vocal jazz, house music, and spy thriller instrumentals. The influence of new wave British guitar-pop was present in equal measure and if anything more apparent than on the debut. Songs titled after the British acts Haircut 100 and The Colourfield made the connection overt.

Flipper's Guitar followed Camera Talk with their first national tour. The duo kept busy in the studio releasing the extended-play Camera! Camera! Camera! in September and the non-album single "Love Train" b/w "Slide" in November. The title-track of Camera! Camera! Camera! is an alternate 'guitar pop' recording of the Camera Talk album track with John "Segs" Jennings and David Ruffy.

=== Doctor Head's World Tower (1991) ===
1991 found the group pursuing their interest in the British alternative scenes of house, Madchester/baggy and an extensive use of sampling. "Groove Tube", their first single of 1991 and a primer for their third album had a new sound that combined pop accessibility with shoegaze and Madchester/baggy styles. The single bears a similarity to "Fool's Gold" by the Stone Roses, "Soon" by My Bloody Valentine and "Come Together" by Primal Scream.

That summer the group released Doctor Head's World Tower (ヘッド博士の世界塔). The album title is a reference to the Monkees's 1968 film Head. Samples of dialogue from Head appear throughout. Stylistically the album was another leap-forward for the group that showcased an increased use of sampling and the obvious influence of groups like Primal Scream and the Happy Mondays giving the album a tripped-out dance groove. Gone were short acoustic pop songs of the debut and the bossa nova/Latin, vocal jazz leanings of Camera Talk. In there place were songs of much greater length, three of which were over six-minutes long.

The group's innovative method of sampling involved a cut-and-paste construction and marriage of samples from the Beach Boys' "God Only Knows" to Eyeless in Gaza's "Changing Stations" and lifting a large portion of Strawberry Switchblade's "Trees and Flowers" ("Dolphin Song"). The album's closing track "The World Tower" at ten minutes in length is a psychedelic track that segues between sections of guitar-rock, music-hall and sound collages. The album was followed by the group's final single, "Blue Shinin' Quick Star" b/w "Dolphin Song".

=== Break-up ===
In the months after the release of Doctor Head's World Tower, tensions between Ozawa and Oyamada broke-out into acrimony. Flipper's Guitar announced that they had broken-up in October that year. Booked tour dates were cancelled.

Since the duo's split their label Polystar has issued several compilation albums. The first Colour Me Pop (カラー・ミー・ポップ) released December 1991 collected non-album singles, b-sides, live-tracks and rarities. A live-album On Pleasure Bent, compiled from tours in 1990 and 1991, followed in 1992. That same year the 12-track Singles album was also released. Treasure Collection, a further compilation followed in 1999. Lost Pictures, Original Clips & CMS + Testament, a video collection was released in 1993 on VHS and on DVD in 2004. Tribute to Flipper's Guitar: Friends Again, a tribute album was released in 2004.

=== After Flipper's Guitar ===
Following the demise of the band in 1991, the two members pursued solo careers. Ozawa began a solo career and released the album The Dogs Bark But The Caravan Moves On under his own name. Oyamada began recording under the name of Cornelius. It was as Cornelius that Oyamada gained a minor cult following outside Japan, as well as remix work for the likes of Blur, Beck, and the Manic Street Preachers. Oyamada formed and ran the sub-label Trattoria for Polystar records.

== Band members ==
- Keigo Oyamada – lead vocals, guitar, sitar, harmonica, synthesizers, programming, producer (1987-1991)
- Kenji Ozawa – guitar, vocals, synthesizers, programming, producer (1987-1991)
- Shusaku Yoshida – bass (1987-1990)
- Yasunobu Arakawa – drums, backing vocals (1987-1990)
- Yukiko Inoue – keyboards, backing vocals (1987-1990)

== Discography ==
Flipper's Guitar discography
- Studio albums: 3
- Compilation albums: 4
- Singles: 6
- Video albums: 4
- Music videos: 1

The discography of Flipper's Guitar consists of three studio albums, four compilation albums, five singles, an extended play and a video.

All titles were released on Polystar; except where indicated.

Studio albums

- Three Cheers for Our Side! (25 August 1989) JPN #41
- Camera Talk (6 June 1990) JPN #6
- Doctor Head's World Tower (10 July 1991) JPN #8

Compilation albums

- Colour Me Pop (21 December 1991 - Polystar/Trattoria) JPN #19
- On Pleasure Bent (1 April 1992 - Polystar/Trattoria) - compilation of live recordings JPN #15
- Singles (26 September 1992) JPN #27
- Treasure Collection (30 June 1999)

Singles and extended plays

- "Friends Again" b/w "Happy Like a Honeybee" (25 January 1990)
- "Young, Alive, In Love" b/w "Haircut 100" (5 May 1990) JPN #17
- Camera! Camera! Camera! (25 September 1990) - EP
- "Love Train" b/w "Slide" (21 November 1990) JPN #40
- "Groove Tube" b/w "Groove Tube Part 2" (20 March 1991) JPN #22
- "Blue Shinin' Quick Star" b/w "Dolphin Song" (25 August 1991) JPN #39

Video

- The Lost Pictures and Three Plus One (Laserdisc/VHS) (10 March 1990)
- Original Clips & CMs (Laserdisc/VHS) (1990)
- Testament (Laserdisc/VHS) (1991)
- Lost Pictures, Original Clips & CMs + Testament (VHS) (1 September 1993) (DVD) (28 January 2004)

Tribute albums

- Tribute to Flipper's Guitar: Friends Again (19 November 2003 - Pastel Music)
