= Bordeaux International School =

Coordinates: 44.84031°N 0.59666°W

- Bordeaux; France

Information
- Type: Private international school
- Established: 1988
- Gender: Coeducational
- Age: 3 to 18
- Language: French, English
- Website: bordeaux-school.com

Bordeaux International School, also known as BIS, is a private (fee-paying) international school for ages 3–18 located in Bordeaux, France, established in 1988. Students are from both France and other countries.

The medium of instruction is English and French in the primary streams and mainly English in the secondary school. The school moved to new premises in rue Judaïque in August 2005.

== Organisation ==
The school educates in four stages:

- Early Learning 3–6 bilingual (English French)
- Primary 6–10 bilingual (English and French)
- Middle School 10–14 bilingual (English and French)
- Secondary 14–18 (English)

Early Learning and Primary grades are given colors instead of numbers, while higher grades have abbreviations for names, such as LMS for Lower Middle School (5th and 6th grade)
