= Cura personalis =

Latin phrase

Cura personalis is a Latin phrase that translates to "personal care" but is widely translated as "care for the entire person." Cura personalis suggests individualized attention to the needs of the other.

The expression is a hallmark of Ignatian spirituality that is commonly used by the Catholic religious order, the Society of Jesus. Originally used to describe the responsibility of the Jesuit superior to care for each man in the community with his unique gifts, challenges, needs and possibilities, this value now is applied more broadly to include the relationship between educators and students and professional relationships among all those who work in the academic (usually university) environment, generally of Roman Catholic educational institutions. The phrase is also a value at a number of Jesuit colleges and universities, such as Georgetown University and campaigns for Fordham University.
