= Bachelor of Independent Studies =

A Bachelor of Independent Studies is an undergraduate academic degree. Its program of studies is unique to each student, and the individual curricula are largely determined by each student. It may focus in any field, and generally has two phases: a pre-thesis phase, in which the student takes courses or reading courses, and a thesis phase, in which the student completes a substantial thesis. A similarly name Bachelor of Interdisciplinary Studies is also awarded by some universities. The degree can be considered akin to a degree in general studies and is becoming increasingly popular in the United States. The Bachelor of Independent Studies targets adult learners previously unable to complete their educational pursuits, through transfer credit options and interdisciplinary concentrations tailored to each student.

While it is an undergraduate degree, it is far more akin in structure to a graduate degree. The state of Florida has developed an external degree program for the BIS degree; Florida International University, Florida State University, the University of Florida, the University of North Florida, and the University of South Florida all participate. In Kentucky, Murray State University now offers a BIS program as well. Several other colleges are beginning to offer degrees that are very similar to or identical with the BIS program, such as the University of Northern Iowa and its Bachelor of Liberal Studies program, or Brigham Young University's Bachelor of General Studies program. George Mason University's BIS degree includes Early Childhood Education and calls it the Bachelor of Individualized Studies.

== List of institutions awarding Bachelor of Independent Studies degrees ==
- George Mason University, Fairfax, Virginia
- University of Waterloo, Waterloo, Ontario, Canada This degree was inactivated in September, 2016, after being offered for 30 years, due to a decline in demand for the degree option.
- James Madison University, Harrisonburg, Virginia
- Murray State University, Murray, Kentucky
- University of South Florida, Tampa Bay, Florida
- New Mexico State University, Las Cruces, New Mexico
- Weber State University, Ogden, Utah
- Fairleigh Dickinson University, Teaneck, New Jersey
- Edinboro University, Edinboro, Pennsylvania
- Hong Kong University of Science and Technology, the programme is named as BSc in Individualized Interdisciplinary Major Program (IIM)

== List of institutions awarding Bachelor of Interdisciplinary Studies degrees ==
- Georgia State University, Atlanta, Georgia
- Arizona State University, Tempe, Arizona
- Emporia State University, Emporia, Kansas
- Jones College, Jacksonville, Florida
- Louisiana State University, Baton Rouge, Louisiana
- Missouri Western State University, Saint Joseph, Missouri
- University of New Orleans, New Orleans, Louisiana
- University of North Alabama, Florence, Alabama
- UNC Pembroke, North Carolina
- University of South Alabama, Mobile, Alabama
- University of Southern Mississippi, Hattiesburg, Mississippi
- Southern University, Baton Rouge, Louisiana
- Southern Utah University, Cedar City, Utah
- Stevenson University, Owings Mills, Maryland
- Western Kentucky University, Bowling Green, Kentucky
- Winston Salem State University, Winston-Salem, North Carolina
- Hong Kong University of Science and Technology, the programme is named as BSc in Individualized Interdisciplinary Major Program (IIM)
- University of Virginia, Charlottesville, Virginia

== See also ==
- Bachelor of Integrated Studies
- Bachelor of General Studies
- Bachelor of Liberal Studies
