= Mogra (nightclub) =

Nightclub in Akihabara, Tokyo, Japan

Coordinates: 35.70207°N 139.77502°E

Mogra is a nightclub located in Akihabara, Tokyo, Japan. The club specializes in DJs that play music associated with otaku culture, including anime, video game, J-pop, and J-core music.

== History ==
The club was founded by Akihabara-based promoter DEARSTAGE inc., and opened its doors in August of 2009. Its first resident DJ, D-YAMA, had recently begun performing DJ sets incorporating remixes he had found on the video sharing platform Nico Nico Douga, such as Vocaloid songs, and Touhou Project arrangements. GamesIndustry.biz described the club as having been "long known both inside and outside of Japan as a geeky music club in the heart of Akiba, with cheap drinks and anime and video game music blasting through its compact underground space."

American musician Porter Robinson has regularly visited Mogra when in Tokyo, describing it as "one of my favorite places in the world." In 2022, the club hosted a Crunchyroll-sponsored stage entitled "Anime Shelter" at his Second Sky Festival event in San Francisco, which featured a lineup of its resident DJs. The club also hosts Tokyo Indies, a monthly gathering of Japanese indie game developers.

In April 2020, in the midst of the COVID-19 pandemic, Mogra organized an online event called "Music Unity 2020" in cooperation with other Japanese clubs and music venues. The event featured 17 DJs playing music from their homes or from closed venues, and was streamed online via Mogra's Twitch channel. The event also included a fundraiser, with proceeds going to participating artists and venues, as well as medical institutions.

== In popular culture ==
Mogra appears in the final episode of the first season of Saekano: How to Raise a Boring Girlfriend, where Michiru's band plays at an event held at the club.

== See also ==
- Akiba-kei
