= Doctor of Liberal Studies =

Advanced academic degree in the US

The Doctor of Liberal Studies (DLS) is an academic degree offered by a handful of higher education institutions in the United States including Georgetown University, Southern Methodist University and the University of Memphis.

Doctor of Liberal Studies programs are typically geared for accomplished professionals seeking an interdisciplinary academic program that can be tailored to their needs. Cohorts typically consist of between 6 and 15 students.

The D.L.S. is a research doctorate that prepares students to make original intellectual contributions in their fields of study, and are not primarily intended for the practice of a profession. Rather than pursue research in a single discipline, D.L.S. students create new knowledge through the synthesis of interdisciplinary research.

Graduates of the program often return to their established career domains, including national security, journalism, health care, education, law and other areas. A handful of graduates of the Doctor of Liberal Studies program at Georgetown University have secured university positions on the tenure-track and in higher education administration; though some colleges and universities only accept Ph.D. applicants, particularly for programs that require advanced research methods.

== See also ==
- Doctor of Liberal Arts
- Doctor of Letters at Drew University
