= Bachelor of Liberal Studies =

Academic degree

The Bachelor of Liberal Studies (BLS) is an undergraduate degree conferred by higher education institutions.

== See also ==
- Master of Liberal Studies
- Doctor of Liberal Studies
