= Bachelor of General Studies =

Degree offered by some universities in North America

A Bachelor of General Studies or a Bachelor in General Studies (BGS) is a highly interdisciplinary undergraduate academic degree offered by higher education institutions that "allows students to combine and explore multiple subjects."

The concept of general studies derives from the medieval European university concept of studium generale. A BGS program allows students to design a degree plan with advisors while meeting their academic institution's general requirements. Students can typically choose from concentrations in a variety of areas.

While exact degree titles vary by institution, many top universities provide equivalent customizable degree tracks—such as the Bachelor in General Studies at the University of Michigan, Student-Defined B.A./B.S. programs at Carnegie Mellon University, or individual interdisciplinary major options at institutions like Cornell and Northwestern.

== See also ==
- General Studies
- Liberal arts education (Bachelor of Liberal Arts)
