= ACTC =

ACTC may refer to:

- ACTC1
- Stock symbol for Advanced Cell Technology
- Alameda County Transportation Commission, California, US
- All Ceylon Tamil Congress, a Sri Lankan political party representing the Sri Lankan Tamil ethnic minority
- Andhra Christian Theological College, Hyderabad, India
- Apple Certified Technical Coordinator
- Ashland Community and Technical College, Kentucky, US
- Asociación Corredores de Turismo Carretera, motorsport governing body
- Associated Colleges of the Twin Cities 5 liberal arts colleges in Minneapolis-Saint Paul, Minnesota
- Association for Core Texts and Courses
- Australian Counter-Terrorism Centre
