= Great Books programs in Canada =

Great Books programs in Canada are university or university college programs inspired by the Great Books movement begun in the United States in the 1920s. The aim of such programs is to return to the Western Liberal Arts tradition in education. Those who mount such programs consider them to be corrective of what they perceive to be an extreme disciplinary specialisation common within the academy.

The essential component of such programs is engagement with the Western canon of whole primary texts deemed to be essential for a student's education. The canon includes books such as Plato's Republic and Dante's Divine Comedy. Great Books programs often focus exclusively on Western culture. Their employment of primary texts dictates an interdisciplinary approach, as most of the Great Books do not fall neatly under the scope of a single contemporary academic discipline.

Great Books programs often include designated discussion groups as well as lectures, and have small class sizes. Students in these programs usually receive an abnormally high degree of attention from their professors, as part of the overall aim of fostering a community of learning.

== First-year Great Books programs ==
=== British Columbia ===
The University of British Columbia in Vancouver has offered the Arts One course since 1967. It is a team-taught, interdisciplinary course for first-year students that consists of a once weekly lecture, twice weekly seminar of 20 students, and once weekly tutorials of four students doing peer evaluation of each other's essays. Students read approximately a book a week, of which many would be considered "great books," within and beyond the Western tradition.

=== New Brunswick ===
St. Thomas University in Fredericton runs an interdisciplinary Great Books program exclusively for first-year students called The Aquinas Program.

=== Nova Scotia ===
St. Francis Xavier University offers a first-year Great-Books curriculum called the Humanities Colloquium. The University of King's College in Halifax began its Great Books program in 1972 and is titled the first-year Foundation Year Program. Students spend their entire first year reading primary texts from the Ancient Near East to the Contemporary World.

=== Ontario ===
McMaster University's Arts and Science Program has three mandatory, core courses in the spirit of Great Books:

- Western Civilization, roughly covering from the Enûma Eliš and Book of Genesis to Renaissance thinkers
- Modern Western Civilization, roughly covering from Thomas Aquinas to contemporary thinkers like Stanley Fish
- Literature, roughly covering from Homeric epics to Christa Wolf's Cassandra

King's University College, a university college affiliated with Western University has a first-year Great Books program called Foundations in The New Liberal Arts.

=== Quebec ===
Laval University in Quebec City offers, in French, a one-year program in Great Books. The program is called "Certificat sur les oeuvres marquantes de la culture occidentale."

== Full-degree Great Books programs ==
=== British Columbia ===
Vancouver Island University in Nanaimo used to offer a Bachelor of Arts degree with a major and minor in Liberal Studies since 1991. The Liberal Studies courses are interdisciplinary, seminar-based and team-taught; they deal primarily but not exclusively with the Western tradition, focus on the development of critical skills and include hands-on art and science. This was cancelled in 2026 due to budget cuts.

=== New Brunswick ===
St. Thomas University in Fredericton has a Great Books program that allows one to complete a major in the field.

=== Ontario ===
Carleton University's The College of the Humanities in Ottawa offers a 4-year honours Great Books program degree called the Bachelor of Humanities, focusing on Philosophy, Literature, Religion, History, and Political Theory, with required courses in the History of Art and the History of Music. Its main focus is on Western Culture, but it has a significant Eastern component. Students regularly do a combined honours degree in Humanities and a more specialised discipline. The College of the Humanities also offers a combined honours in Humanities and Biology, designed for students heading to medical school. With the School of Journalism at Carleton, they also offer a joint Journalism and Humanities degree.

=== Quebec ===
Concordia University in Montreal has a Liberal Arts College which offers a 3-year bachelor's degree in the Great Books.

== See also ==
- Liberal Arts College
- Humanities
- Western canon
