= Classic book =

Exemplary or noteworthy book

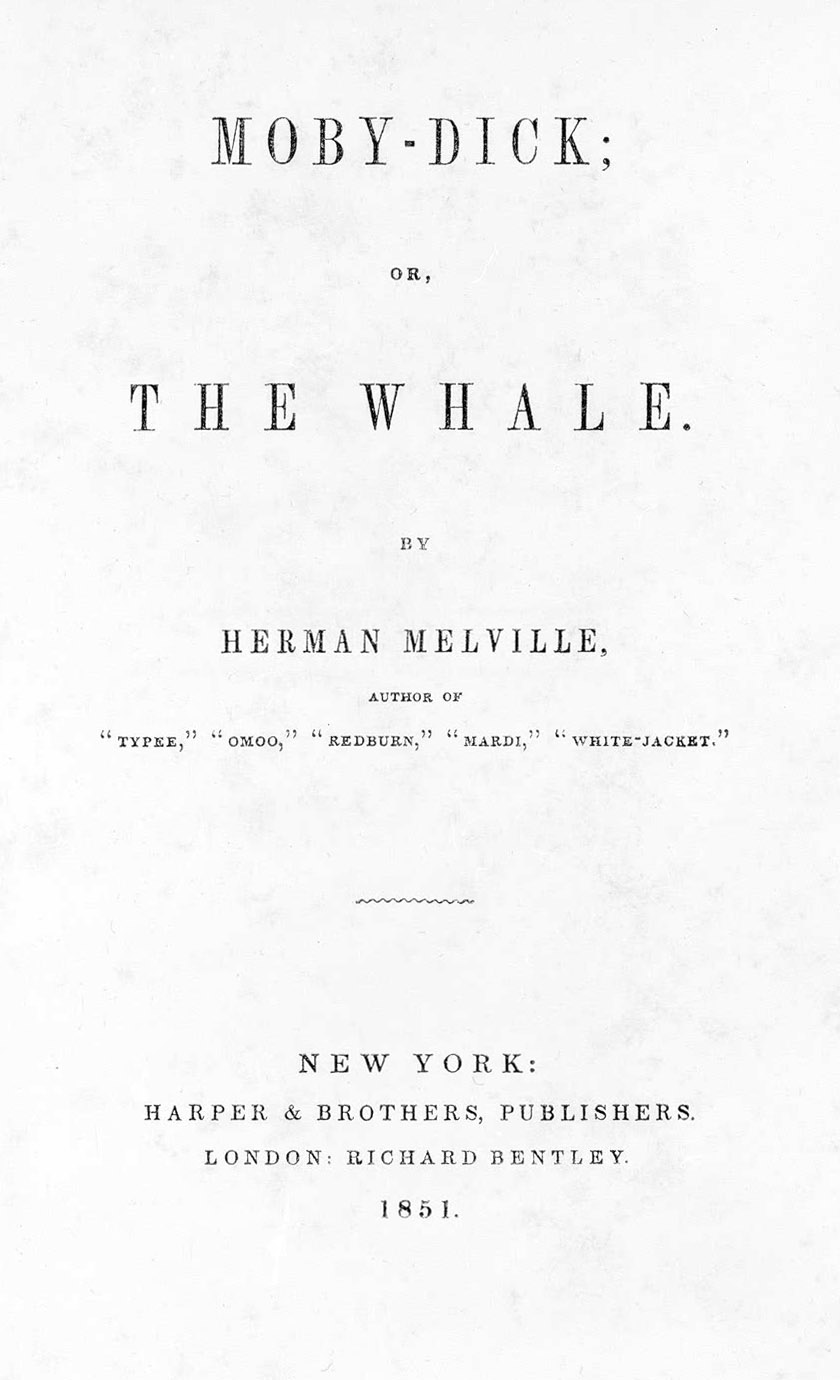
Moby-Dick by Herman Melville (1851), an example of a "classic book"

A classic is a book accepted as being exemplary or particularly noteworthy, usually of some chronological age since its original publications. What makes a book "classic" is a concern that has occurred to various authors ranging from Italo Calvino to Mark Twain and the related questions of "Why Read the Classics?" and "What Is a Classic?" have been essayed by authors from different genres and eras (including Calvino, T. S. Eliot, Charles Augustin Sainte-Beuve). The ability of a classic book to be reinterpreted, re-translated, abridged and parodied, to seemingly be renewed in the interests of generations of readers succeeding its creation, is a theme that is seen in the writings of literary critics including Michael Dirda, Ezra Pound, and Sainte-Beuve. These books can be published as a collection such as Great Books of the Western World, Modern Library, or Penguin Classics; debated, as in the Great American Novel; or presented as a list, such as Harold Bloom's list of books that constitute the Western canon. Although the term is often associated with the Western canon, it can be applied to works of literature from all traditions, such as the Chinese classics or the Indian Vedas. A book considered by some as of similar notoriety and impact but more recent are frequently called "modern classic" or "upcoming classic".

Many universities incorporate these readings into their curricula, such as "The Reading List" at St. John's College, Rutgers University, or Dharma Realm Buddhist University. The study of these classic texts both allows and encourages students to become familiar with some of the most revered authors throughout history. This is meant to equip students and newly found scholars with a plethora of resources to utilize throughout their studies and beyond.

== History ==
For the etymology of classic, see the related Classics § Etymology.

In 1850, Charles Augustin Sainte-Beuve (1804–1869) stated his answer to the question "What is a Classic?" ("Qu'est-ce qu'un classique?"):

The idea of a classic implies something that has continuance and consistence, and which produces unity and tradition, fashions and transmits itself, and endures.... A true classic, as I should like to hear it defined, is an author who has enriched the human mind, increased its treasure, and caused it to advance a step; who has discovered some moral and not equivocal truth, or revealed some eternal passion in that heart where all seemed known and discovered; who has expressed his thought, observation, or invention, in no matter what form, only provided it be broad and great, refined and sensible, sane and beautiful in itself; who has spoken to all in his own peculiar style, a style which is found to be also that of the whole world, a style new without neologism, new and old, easily contemporary with all time.

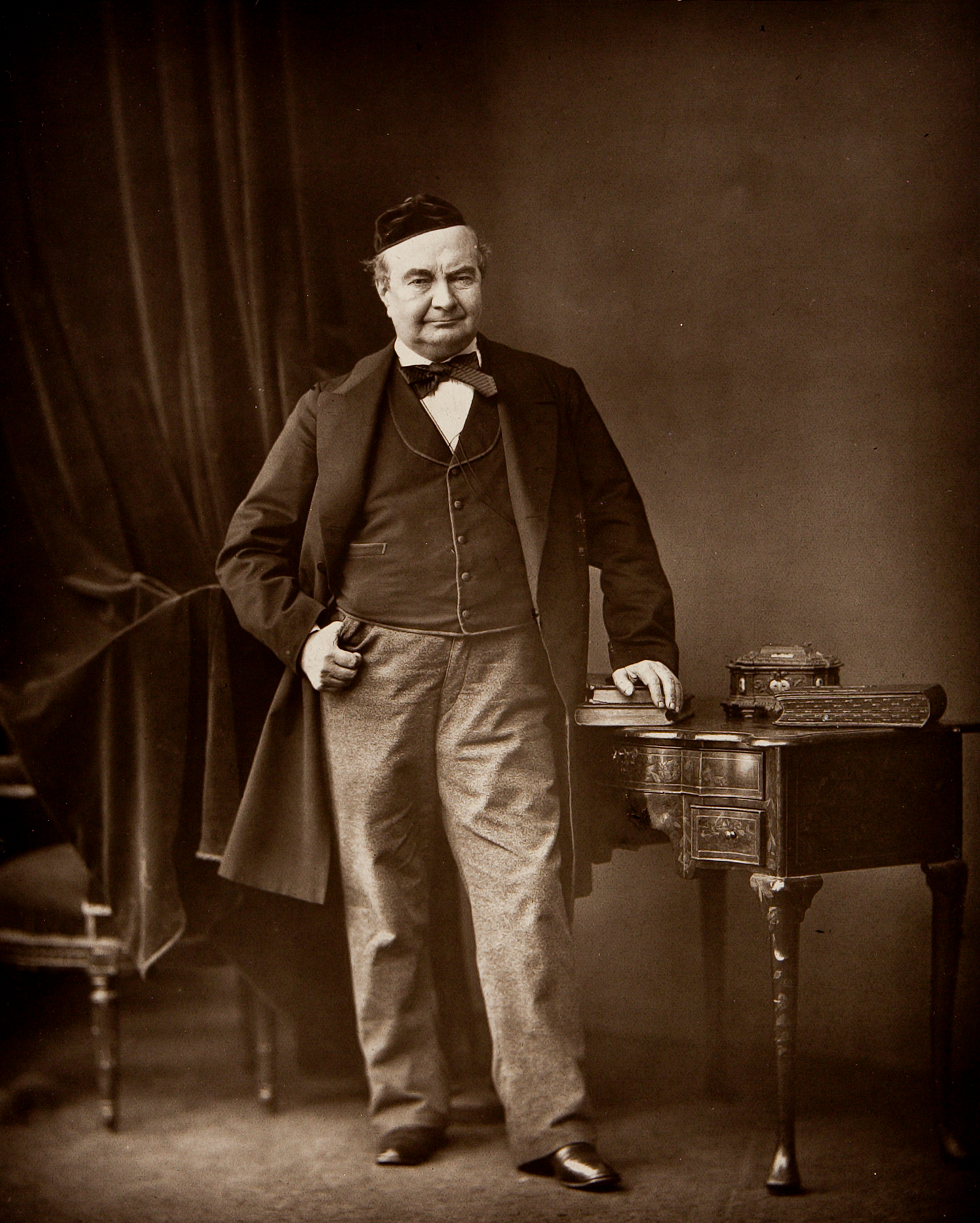
Charles Augustin Sainte-Beuve

In this same essay, Sainte-Beuve quoted Goethe (referring to the "classics" concept): "Ancient works are classical not because they are old, but because they are powerful, fresh, and healthy." (Note: Sainte-Beuve's "What is a Classic" essay was originally published in Le Constitutionnel on October 21, 1850, as "Qu'est-ce qu'un classique?—Lundis" ("Monday"), Volume III, 40. (Stephen Moeller-Sally, "Gogol's afterlife: the evolution of a classic in Imperial and Soviet Russia" [Evanston, Illinois: Northwestern University Press, 2002], p. 168). However it originated, an error regarding the date of Saint-Beauve's "What Is a Classic?" has crept into some sources. According to historical calendars,<http://arc.id.au/Calendar.html>, Monday, October 21 had to be the in 1850, not 1860. The year is erroneously stated as 1860 in A. Pichon's edition of Saint Beuve's work in "Causeries Du Lundi Et Portraits Littraires" (republished in 2009 in its entirety by BiblioBazaar/BiblioLife, LLC).)

The concept of 'the classic' was a theme of T. S. Eliot's literary criticism as well. In The Sacred Wood he thought that one of the reasons "Dante is a classic, and Blake only a poet of genius" was because of "the concentration resulting from a framework of mythology and theology and philosophy". (In commenting about Eliot's influence, Professor Jan Gorak stated that "the idea of a canon has become intertwined with the idea of the classic, an idea that T.S. Eliot tried to revitalize for the 'modern experiment'".) In echoes of Sainte-Beuve, Eliot gave a speech to the Virgil Society concerning himself with the very same question of "What is a Classic?" In his opinion, there was only one author who was 'classic': "No modern language can hope to produce a classic, in the sense I have called Virgil a classic. Our classic, the classic of all Europe, is Virgil." In this instance, though, Eliot said that the word had different meanings in different surroundings and that his concern was with "one meaning in one context". He states his focus is to define only "one kind of art" and that it does not have to be "better...than another kind". His opening paragraph makes a clear distinction between his particular meaning of classic having Virgil as the classic of all literature and the alternate meaning of classic as "a standard author".

Literary figures from different eras have also weighed in on the matter. Alan Bennett, the modern English playwright and author, said that "Definition of a classic: a book everyone is assumed to have read and often thinks they have read themselves." Mark Van Doren, the Columbia University professor and poet, is quoted by Jim Trelease (in his library-monograph Classic Picture Books All Children Should Experience) as saying that "A classic is any book that stays in print". And in his "Disappearance of Literature" speech given in 1900, Mark Twain said (referring to a learned academic's lofty opinion of Milton's Paradise Lost) that the work met the Professor's definition of a classic as "something that everybody wants to have read and nobody wants to read".

In 1920, Fannie M. Clark, a teacher at the Rozelle School in East Cleveland, Ohio, attempted to answer the question of what makes a book a "classic" in her article "Teaching Children to Choose" in The English Journal. Over the course of her essay, Clark considers the question of what makes a piece of literature a classic and why the idea of "the classics" is important to society as a whole. Clark says that "teachers of English have been so long trained in the 'classics' that these 'classics' have become to them very much like the Bible, for the safety of which the rise of modern science causes such unnecessary fears." She goes on to say that among the sources she consulted was a group of eighth-graders when she asked them the question: "What do you understand by the classics in literature?" Two of the answers Clark received were "Classics are books your fathers give you and you keep them to give to your children" and "Classics are those great pieces of literature considered worthy to be studied in English classes of high school or college". Calvino agrees with the Ohio educator when he states "Schools and universities ought to help us understand that no book that talks about a book says more than the book in question, but instead they do their level best to make us think the opposite." Clark and Calvino come to a similar conclusion that when a literary work is analyzed for what makes it 'classic', that in just the act of analysis or as Clark says "the anatomical dissection", the reader can end up destroying the unique pleasure that mere enjoyment a work of literature can hold.

Classics are often defined in terms of their lasting freshness. Clifton Fadiman thought that the works that become classic books have their start in childhood, saying that "If you wish to live long in the memory of men, you should not write for them at all. You should write what their children will enjoy." In his view, the works we now judge to be classics are "great starters". Fadiman unites classic books through the ages in a continuum (and concurs with Goethe's thoughts on the vigour and relevance of the ancient Classics), when he states that classic books share a "quality of beginningness" with the legendary writer of the Iliad and the Odyssey – Homer himself. Ezra Pound in his own tome on reading, ABC of Reading, gave his opinion when he stated, "A classic is classic not because it conforms to certain structural rule, or fits certain definitions (of which its author had quite probably never heard). It is classic because of a certain eternal and irrepressible freshness." Michael Dirda, the 1993 Pulitzer Prize winning critic, concurred with Pound's view regarding the vitality of a classic when he wrote that "...one of the true elements of a classic" was that "they can be read again and again with ever-deepening pleasure."

In the 1980s, Italo Calvino said in his essay "Why Read the Classics?" that "a classic is a book that has never finished saying what it has to say" and comes to the crux of personal choice in this matter when he says (italics in the original translation): "Your classic author is the one you cannot feel indifferent to, who helps you define yourself in relation to him, even in dispute with him." (Note: The essay "Why Read the Classics?" is available in two different anthologies. It was first published in 1980/82 in the Italian as a chapter in "The Uses of Literature" (in 1986 in the English translation) and then re-published in the posthumous collection titled "Why Read the Classics?") Consideration of what makes a literary work a classic is for Calvino ultimately a personal choice, and, constructing a universal definition of what constitutes a Classic Book seems to him to be an impossibility, since, as Calvino says "There is nothing for it but for all of us to invent our own ideal libraries of classics."

While blogging on The Guardian's website in 2009, Chris Cox echoed Twain's "classic" sentiments of 1900 and Bennett's witticism about classic books when he opined that there are actually two kinds of "classic novels":

The first are those we know we should have read, but probably have not. These are generally the books that make us burn with shame when they come up in conversation... The second kind, meanwhile, are those books that we've read five times, can quote from on any occasion, and annoyingly push on to other people with the words: "You have to read this. It's a classic."

== University programs ==
"Classic Books" reading lists are used at some universities and have been in modern vogue since at least the early part of the 20th century, with the additional impetus in 1909 of the Harvard Classics publishing imprimatur having individual works chosen by outgoing Harvard University president Charles W. Eliot.

In 1920, John Erskine taught the first course based on the "Great Books" program, titled "General Honors", at Columbia University, and helped shape its core curriculum. The course, however, initially began to fail shortly after its introduction due to numerous disputes between senior faculty over the best way to conduct classes, as well as concerns about the rigor of the courses. This resulted in junior faculty, including Mark Van Doren and Mortimer Adler after 1923, teaching parts of the course. The course was discontinued in 1928, though later reinstated. Adler left for the University of Chicago in 1929, where he continued his work on the theme, and along with the university president, Robert M. Hutchins, held an annual seminar of great books which he later reworked into The Great Books of the Western World. University trustee and Chicago businessman Walter Paepcke was inspired by the seminar to found the Aspen Institute. In 1937, when Mark Van Doren redesigned the course, it was already being taught at St. John's College, Annapolis, in addition to the University of Chicago. This course was later named Humanities A for freshmen, and then subsequently evolved into Literature Humanities.

Columbia's Core Curriculum, the Common Core at Chicago, and the Core Curriculum at Boston College, each heavily focused on the "great books" of the Western canon, are prominent examples of Classic Books programs in which the majority of enrolled students participate. Fordham University's Honors Program at Rose Hill incorporates the Great Books curriculum into a rigorous first four semesters in the program. Loyola University Chicago's Honors Program combines a Great Books curriculum with additional elective classes on subjects not covered in traditional Western thought over a rigorous four-year program. Over 100 institutions of higher learning in the United States, Canada, and Europe maintain some version of a Great Books Program as an option for students.

In addition, a handful of colleges offer a major whose pedagogy is structured around the Great Books. The University of Notre Dame's Program of Liberal Studies, established in 1950, and housed in the College of Liberals Arts, the Integral Program at Saint Mary's College of California (1955), and the Bachelor of Humanities program offered by the College of the Humanities at Carleton University in Ottawa (1995) are three such examples.

=== Great books colleges in the United States ===
Despite the prevalence of Great Books style courses and majors at a number of universities, there are only a few colleges that teach their curriculum exclusively through the Great Books model, all in the United States. These schools, with their dates either of founding or a move to a Great Books model include:

- St. John's College, Annapolis, Maryland (1937) and Santa Fe (1964)
- Shimer Great Books School (1950) - merged into North Central College in 2017
- Thomas Aquinas College, Santa Paula, California (1971)
- Dharma Realm Buddhist University, Ukiah, California (1976) - first Great Books college offering studies combining Eastern and Western classics.
- Thomas More College of Liberal Arts, Merrimack, New Hampshire (1978)
- New Saint Andrews College, Moscow, Idaho (1994)
- Gutenberg College, Eugene, Oregon (1994)
- Harrison Middleton University, Tempe, Arizona (1998) - online distance-learning and graduate and doctoral only.
- Wyoming Catholic College, Lander, Wyoming (2005)

In recent years, at least one Great Books college has closed:

- Magdalen College of the Liberal Arts, Warner, New Hampshire (1974–2024)

== Curation of reading lists ==
Thomas Jefferson frequently composed great books lists for his friends and correspondents; for example, for Peter Carr in 1785 and again in 1787.

Publishing houses (e.g., Easton Press, Franklin Library, and Folio Society) and colleges/universities (such as Oxford University Press and Yale University Press) frequently publish collections of classic books. Publishers have their various types of "classic book" lines, while colleges and universities have required reading lists as well as associated publishing interests. If these books are the works of literature that well-read people are supposed to have read or at least be familiar with, then the genesis of the classic book genre and the processes through which texts are considered for selection (or not) is of interest. The development of the Penguin Classics line of books, among the best-known of the classic imprints, can serve as a good example.

Penguin Books, the parent company of Penguin Classics, had its inception during the 1930s when the founder, Allen Lane, was unable to find a book he actually wanted to read while at Exeter train station. As the company website tells it, "appalled by the selection on offer, Lane decided that good quality contemporary fiction should be made available at an attractive price and sold not just in traditional bookshops, but also in railway stations, tobacconists and chain stores ...We believed in the existence in this country of a vast reading public and staked everything on it." Within the first year, they had sold three million paperbacks of then-contemporary authors, such as Agatha Christie, Ernest Hemingway, and André Maurois.

In 1954, Mortimer Adler hosted a live weekly television series in San Francisco, comprising 52 half-hour programs, entitled The Great Ideas. These programs were produced by Adler's Institute for Philosophical Research and were carried as a public service by the American Broadcasting Company, presented by National Educational Television, the precursor to what is now PBS. Adler bequeathed these films to the Center for the Study of the Great Ideas, where they are available for purchase.

In 1993 and 1994, The Learning Channel created a series of one-hour programs discussing many of the Great Books of history and their impact on the world. It was narrated by Donald Sutherland and Morgan Freeman, among others.

== See also ==
- Association for Core Texts and Courses
- Banned books
- Educational perennialism
- Liberal arts
- Transcendentalism
- Western canon
