= Saint Mary's College of California =

Catholic college in Moraga, California, US

- Motto: Signum Fidei (Latin)
- Motto in English: The Sign of Faith
- Type: Private college
- Established: 1863; 163 years ago
- Religious affiliation: Catholic (De La Salle Brothers)
- Academic affiliations: ACCU; NAICU; WASC
- Endowment: $215.0 million (2021)
- President: Roger J. Thompson
- Students: 2,736 (fall 2024)
- Undergraduates: 1,955 (fall 2024)
- Postgraduates: 781 (fall 2024)
- Location: Moraga, California, U.S. 37°50′29″N 122°06′33″W
- Campus: Suburban, 420 acres (170 ha)
- Colors: Red and blue
- Nickname: Gaels
- Sporting affiliations: NCAA Division I – WCC
- Mascot: Gael
- Website: www.stmarys-ca.edu

Saint Mary's College of California is a private Catholic college in Moraga, California, United States. Established in 1863, it is administered by the De La Salle Brothers. The college offers undergraduate and graduate programs with a total student count at under 4,000 as of 2018.

== History ==
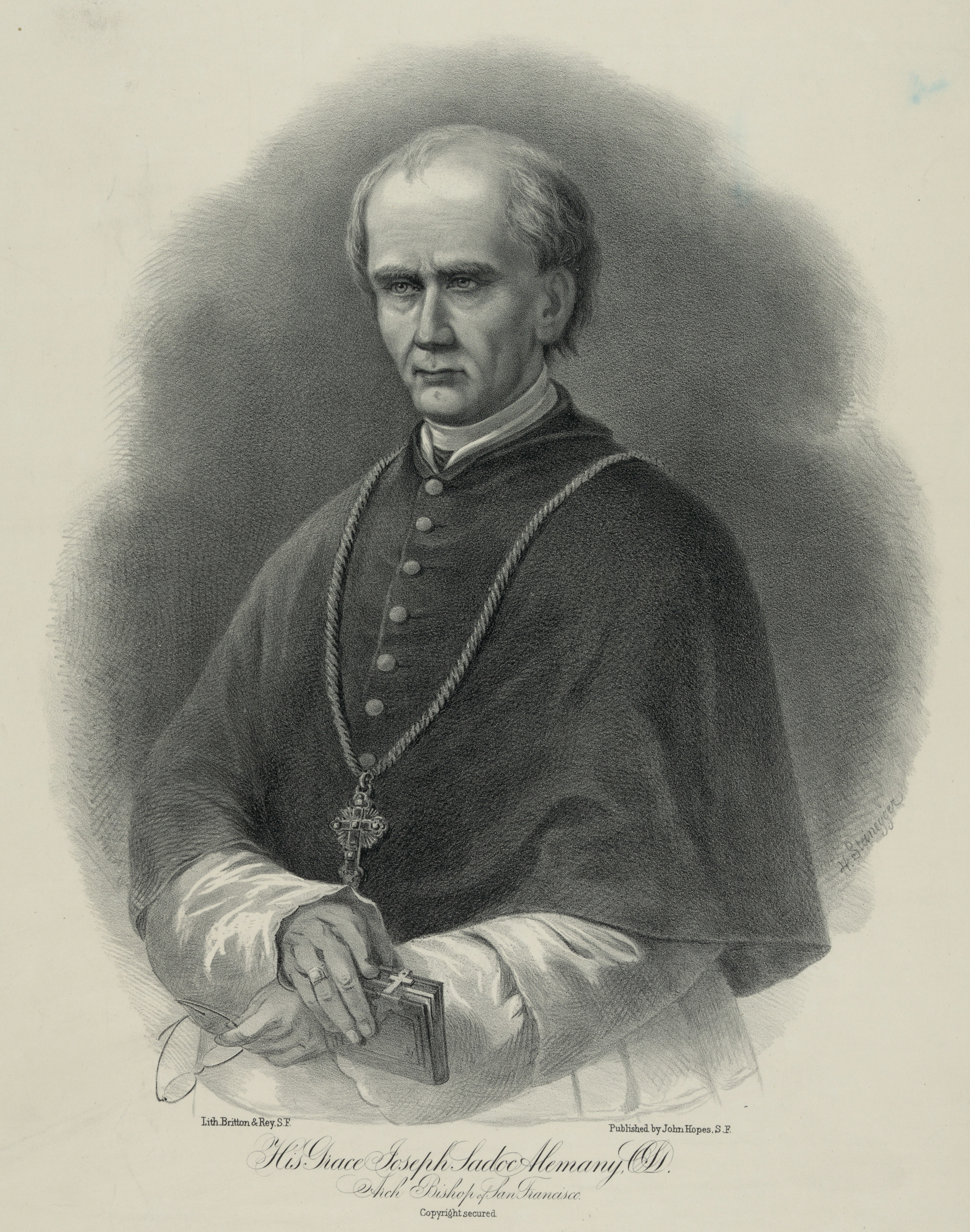
Archbishop José Sadoc Alemany founded St. Mary's in 1863.

St. Mary's College began in 1863 as a diocesan college for boys established by Joseph Alemany, a member of the Dominicans and the first archbishop of San Francisco. One of its first donors was Mary Ellen Pleasant, a famed Black Catholic philanthropist who gave the school roughly $10,000 in today's money to help get the school off the ground.

Unhappy with the archdiocese's operation of the college, Alemany applied for assistance from Rome and in 1868 St. Mary's College was handed over to the De La Salle Christian Brothers.

In 1889, the college moved east across San Francisco Bay to Oakland, California. The location on the corner of 30th and Broadway became affectionately known as "The Brickpile" and Saint Mary's College would call Oakland home until 1928, when it moved further eastward to Moraga after a fire severely damaged the Brickpile. The Oakland site is California Historical Landmark #676 and has been marked by a commemorative plaque. The former San Francisco site is now the site of the St. Mary's Park neighborhood. The college and high school sections separated not long after the move to Moraga and the high school is currently located in Albany.

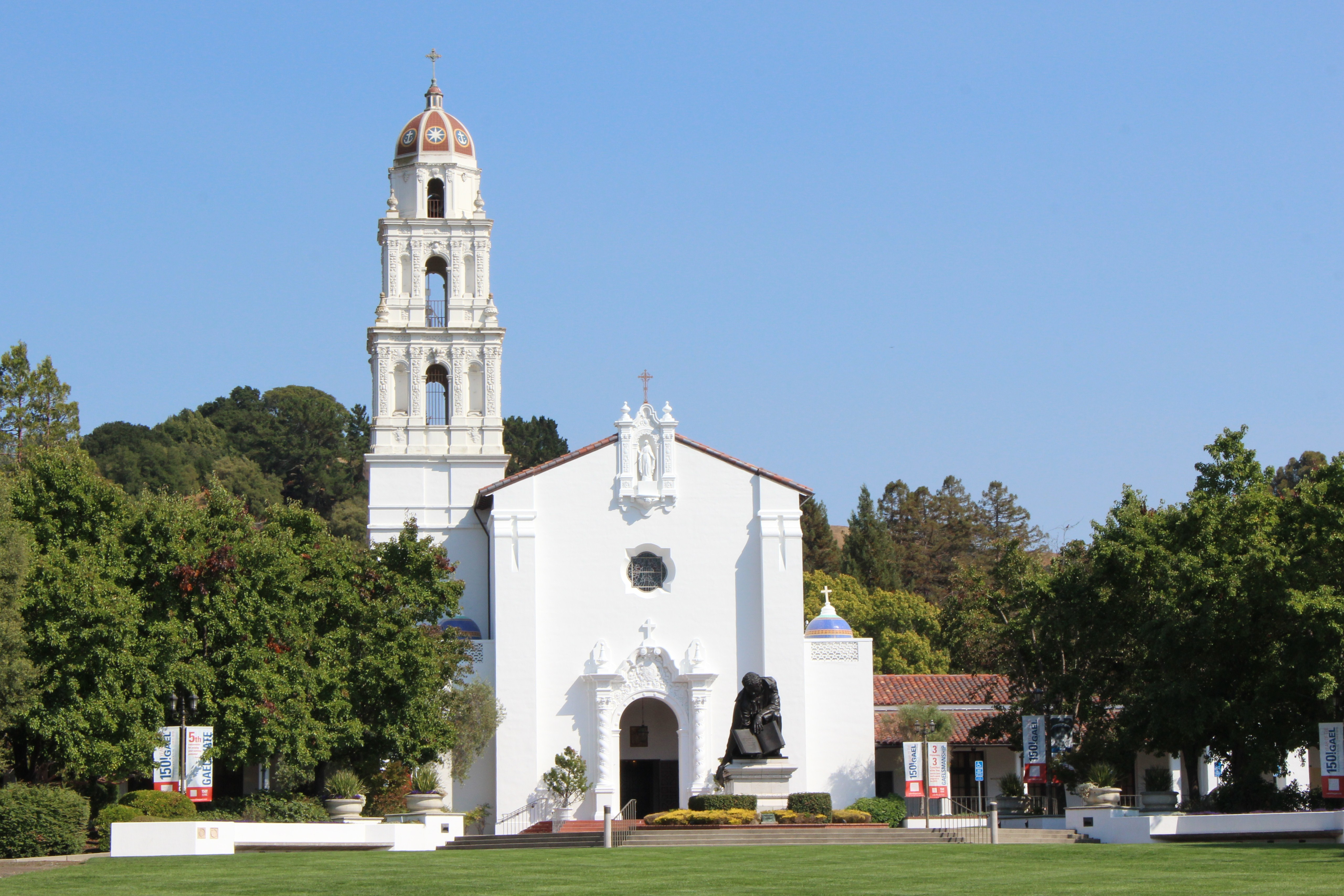
The California Churrigueresque style Chapel of St. Mary is modeled after the Cathedral of Cuernavaca.

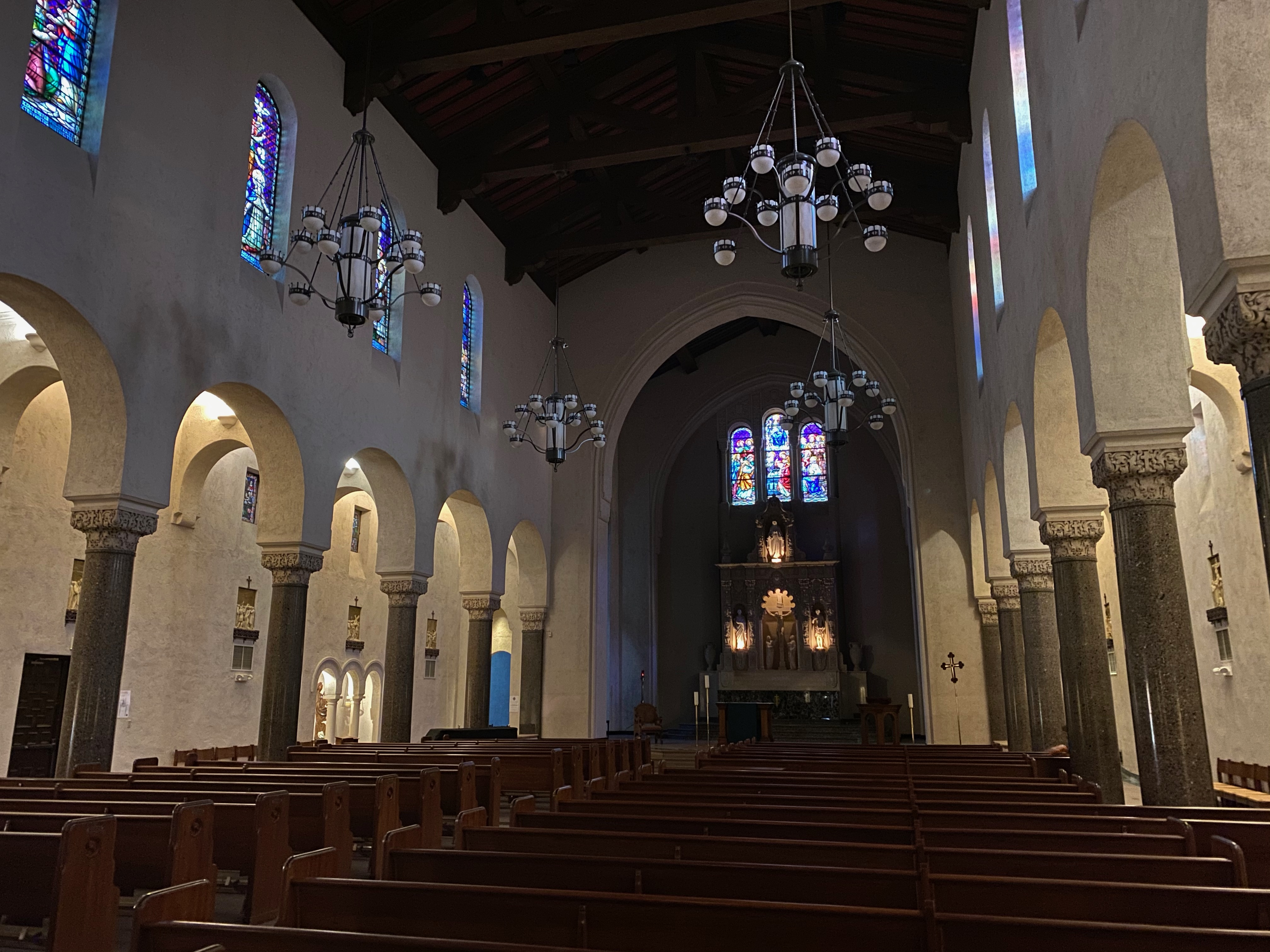
Interior of the Chapel of St. Mary.

During its first years in Moraga, the college nearly went bankrupt, but eventually managed to gain financial security when it was bought by Archbishop John Joseph Mitty, for whom a residence hall is now named. During World War II the college was used by the United States Navy for the training of pilots. Former President Gerald Ford was briefly stationed at the school and served as a naval instructor. The navy erected many buildings, including the world's largest indoor pool, but only one, Assumption Hall, remains on the campus as the school had little use for most of the buildings after the war. Saint Mary's continued to be a male-only school until 1970, when it became coeducational. Since then, more women have come to the college and by 2011, 62% of the students were women.

In the 1970s, the college was well known by secondary schools throughout the San Francisco Bay Area for producing the Saint Mary's Math Contest. The popular contest was discontinued in 1978 but later became the chief inspiration for the Julia Robinson Mathematics Festival which continues to this day.

Roughly two dozen Christian Brothers still live and work at the school and the school presidents had always been Brothers until 2013. Recognizing the dwindling number of Christian Brothers, in 2003 the college's bylaws were changed to allow the election of a non-Christian Brother to the presidency if no qualified Brother exists or steps forward. James A. Donahue, a committed and engaged Roman Catholic, became the first non-Christian Brother to serve as president in the 150-year history of Saint Mary's on July 1, 2013.

== Academics ==
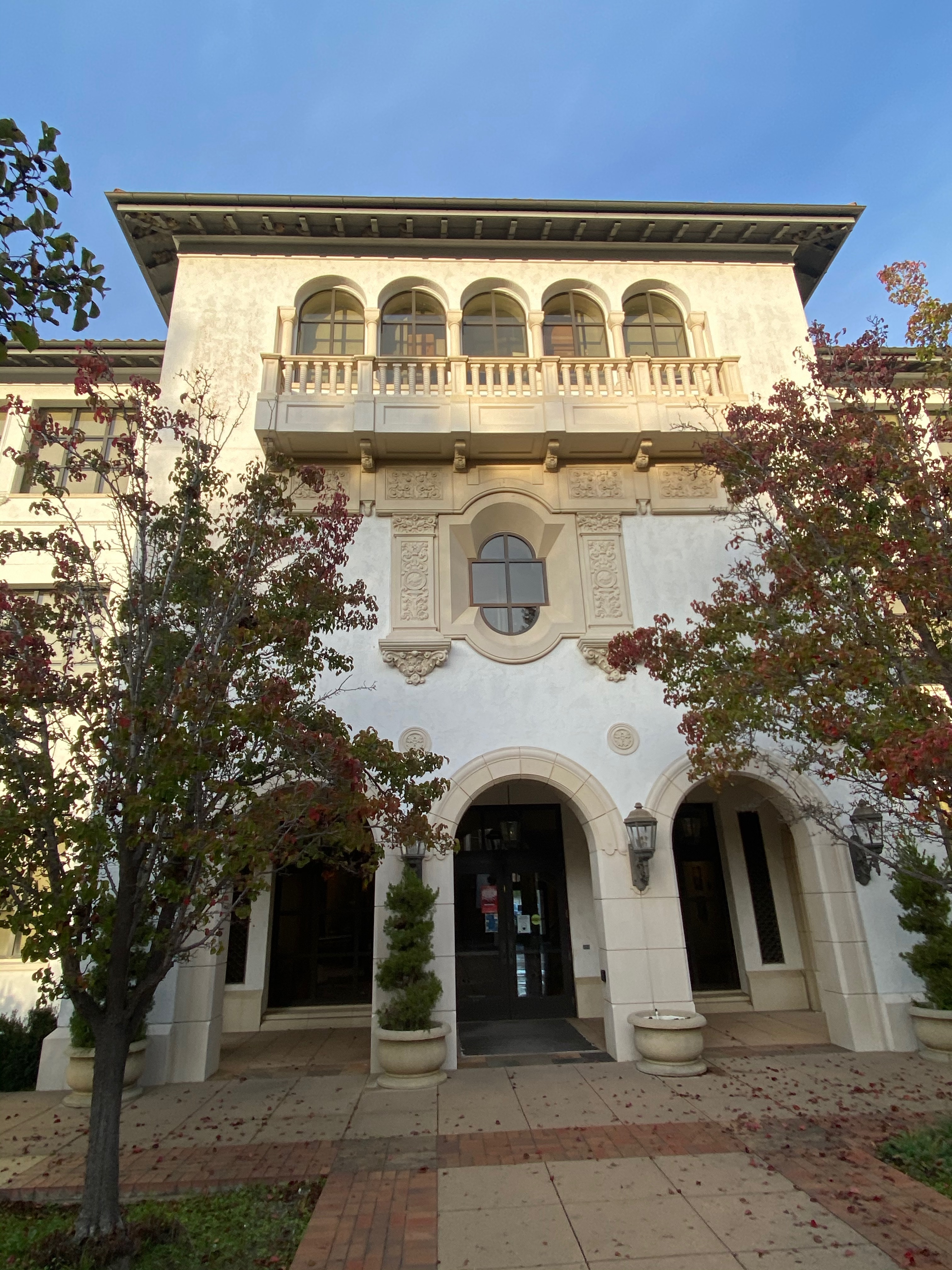
Brousseau Hall is home to the School of Science.

Academic rankings

Master's
- Washington Monthly: 106

Regional
- U.S. News & World Report: 4

National
- Forbes: 297
- WSJ/College Pulse: 193

Undergraduate demographics as of Fall 2020
Race and ethnicity	Total
White	39%
Hispanic	30%
Asian	11%
Other (Note: Other consists of Multiracial Americans & those who prefer to not say.)	11%
Black	4%
Foreign national	3%
Pacific Islander	2%
Economic diversity
Low-income (Note: The percentage of students who received an income-based federal Pell grant intended for low-income students.)	23%
Affluent (Note: The percentage of students who are a part of the American middle class at the bare minimum.)	77%

There are four schools at Saint Mary's: the School of Liberal Arts, the School of Science, the School of Economics and Business Administration, and the Kalmanovitz School of Education. Saint Mary's College is a liberal arts institution, and the majority of undergraduate students are in the School of Liberal Arts. However, the most popular major is Business Administration. This is followed by Psychology, Communication, Kinesiology, and Accounting. The average class size is 19, with a student faculty ratio of 13:1. 91% of classes are taught by full-time faculty, of which 95% hold the highest degree in their fields. There are 40 academic majors, with an option to create your own major. Most Saint Mary's faculty are required to teach six courses per year (three per semester).

=== Collegiate seminar ===
In addition to these general education courses, traditional four-year students take three Collegiate Seminar courses. Although previously based on the academic programs at St. John's College, the Saint Mary's College program is required for all students regardless of major. The first course is offered in the spring of their first year, in the fall of their sophomore year, and then students have the choice of when they want to take the last course during their junior or senior years. Transfer students take a course that combines the first and second-year courses before completing the final course. One section of a Seminar elective course, Multicultural Thought, is offered in both the fall and spring semesters.

=== Integral Program ===
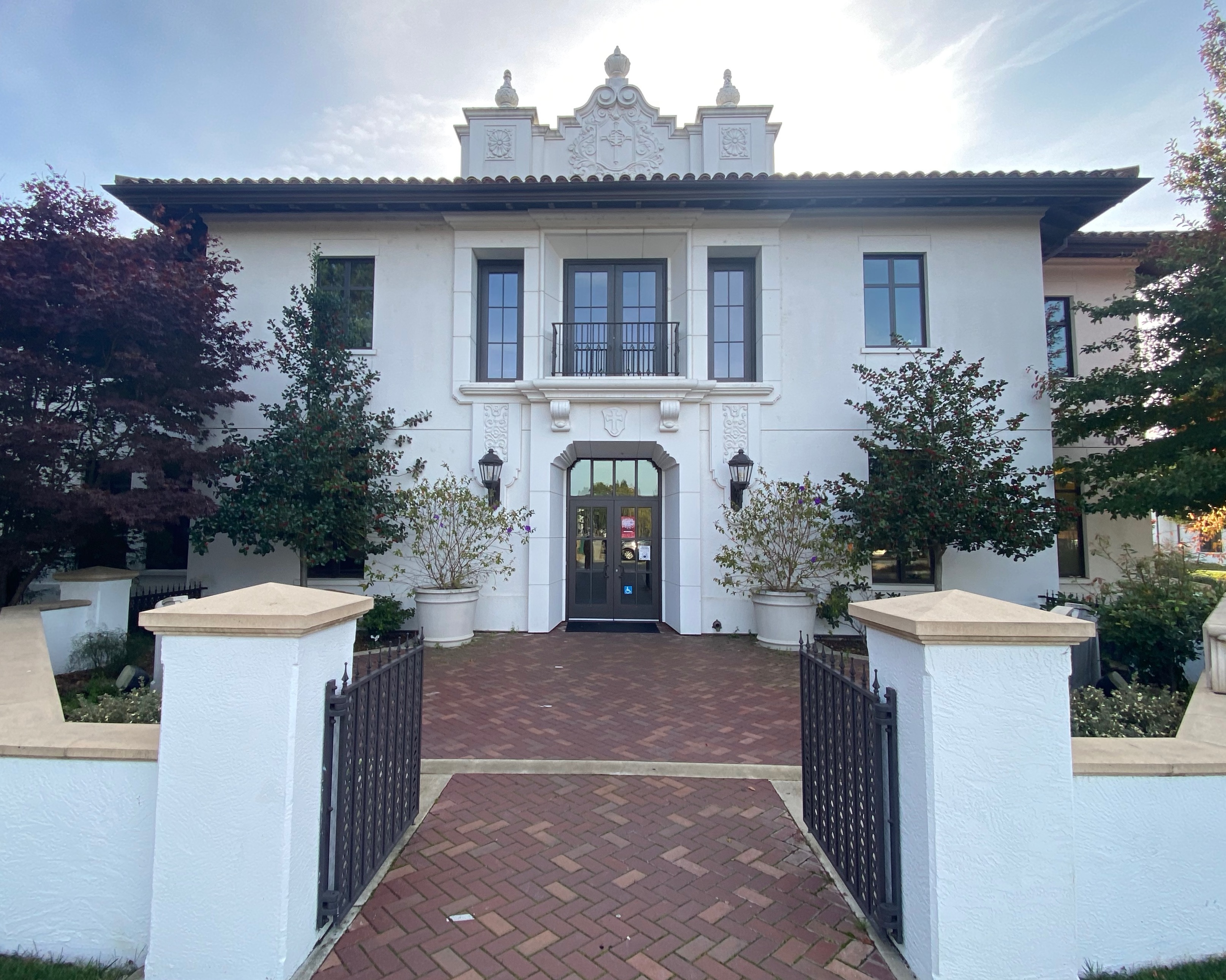
Filippi Hall, home to the Kalmanovitz School of Education

The Integral Liberal Arts Program is a "college-within-a-college". It is distinct from a major at Saint Mary's College, and it incorporates the Seminar method for all of its classes. It was modeled on St. John's College. The Integral Program is a complete four-year Great Books course of study, covering all mathematics, science, religious and language requirements. Instead of taking four classes in addition to the general education, Integral students' entire curriculum, including subjects not traditionally related to the "classics," is in the Seminar style. For example, math is taught through reading and discussing Euclid and Galileo, rather than actually completing numerical problem sets. Although the Seminar portion of the program is twice as long (eight semesters vs. four), moves more quickly and covers more material than the Collegiate Seminar program, it is not an honors program. The program does not have any tests or lectures, however students are expected to complete a substantial amount of reading per night in preparation for classroom discussions. Although seminal works such as the Bible and the writings of some theologians are organic to the Western Canon, the program itself is non-religious. Classics from cultures other than western are in the Program roughly where they were chronologically introduced into western discourse.

While the Integral Program is housed in the School of Liberal Arts and Integral students receive a Bachelor of Arts degree, Integral Liberal Arts students graduate separately from the Liberal Arts majors. Many students go on to graduate school for pre-med or pre-law studies.

=== Term schedule ===
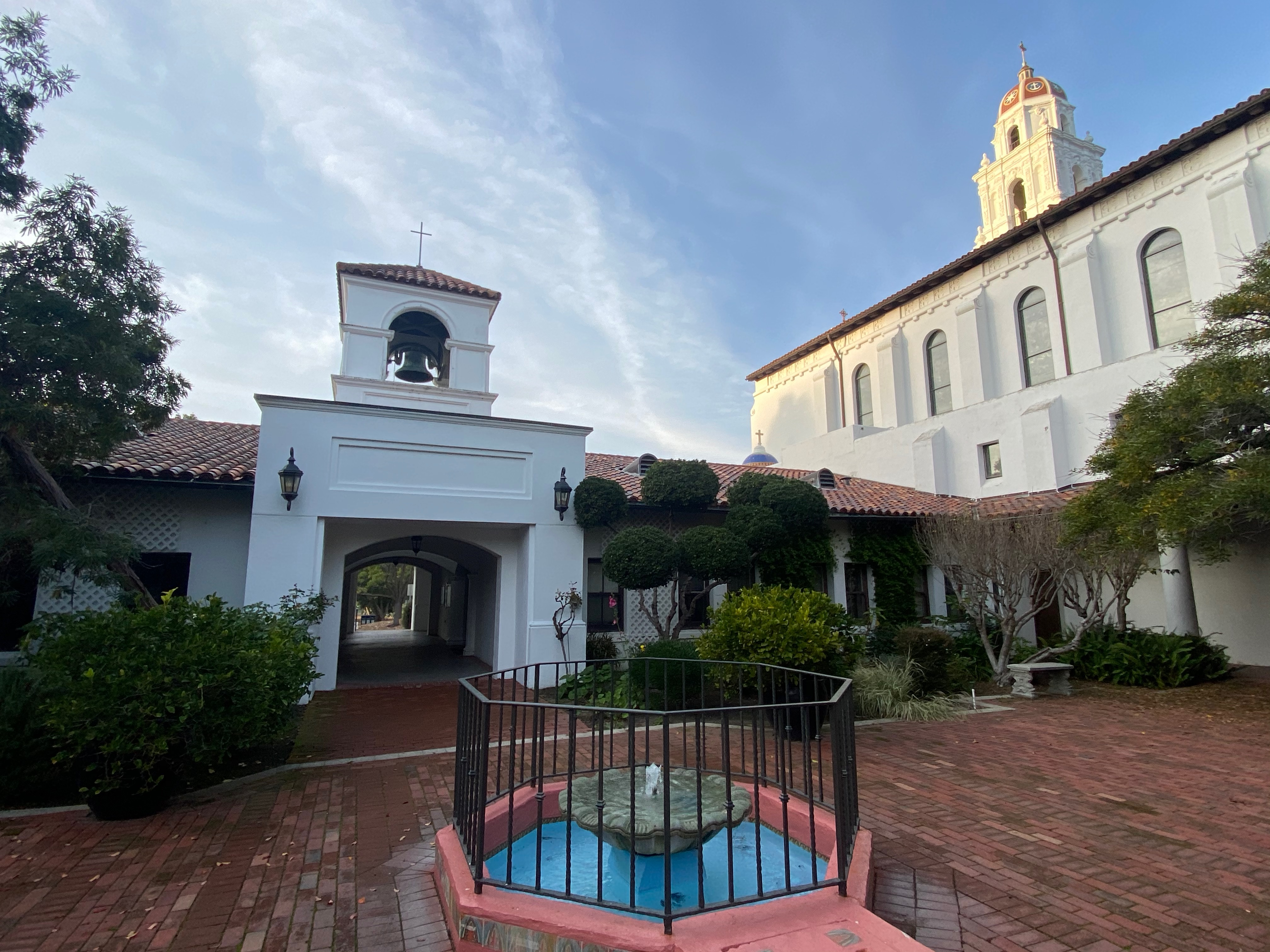
Chapel patio

Saint Mary's has a "4–1–4" system, similar to Middlebury College: fall semester, January Term, and spring semester. Students are given three weeks off for Christmas following fall semester, one week off following Jan-Term, and one week in the middle of spring semester for Easter. Fall semester usually begins the Monday before Labor Day and runs through the second week of December. Graduation is usually the third or fourth week of May.

January Term is an academic session in which during the month of January students are required to take one class and encouraged to take one outside their major. Jan Term classes are more intensive than a normal fall or spring class. Instead of meeting two or three times a week, they meet four times a week for two and a half hours. Students must take four Jan Term classes to graduate. This differs from many colleges at which January Term or "Intersession" is optional. Each year, a committee meets to determine the year's January Term theme, and the process includes a vote of the final three selections by the community. Classes during January Term range from Shakespeare to Star Trek, and students have the option to travel abroad for their January class. There are also optional quarter credit classes for January Term and during the semesters, such as digital photography or weight training.

== Campus ==
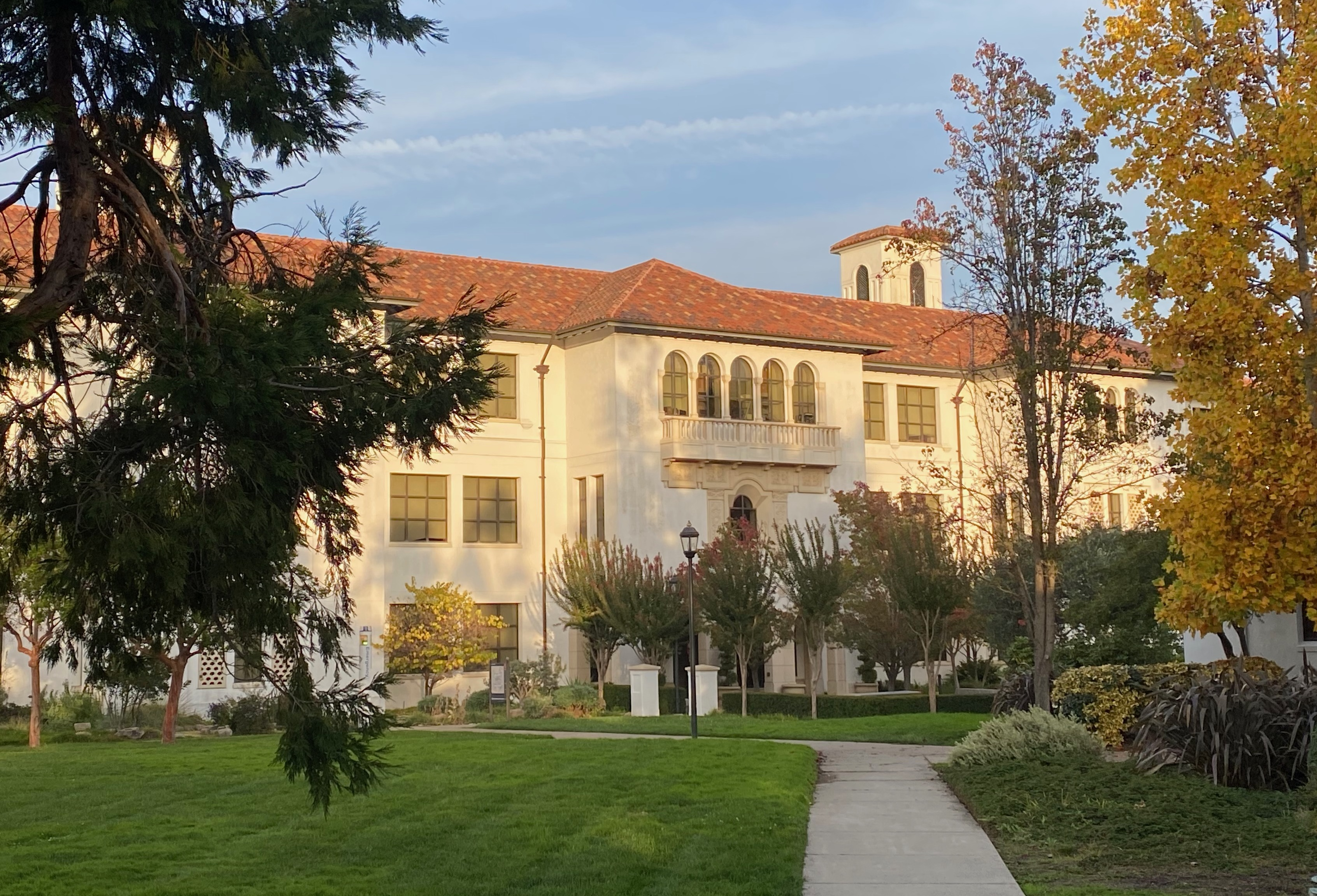
View of campus

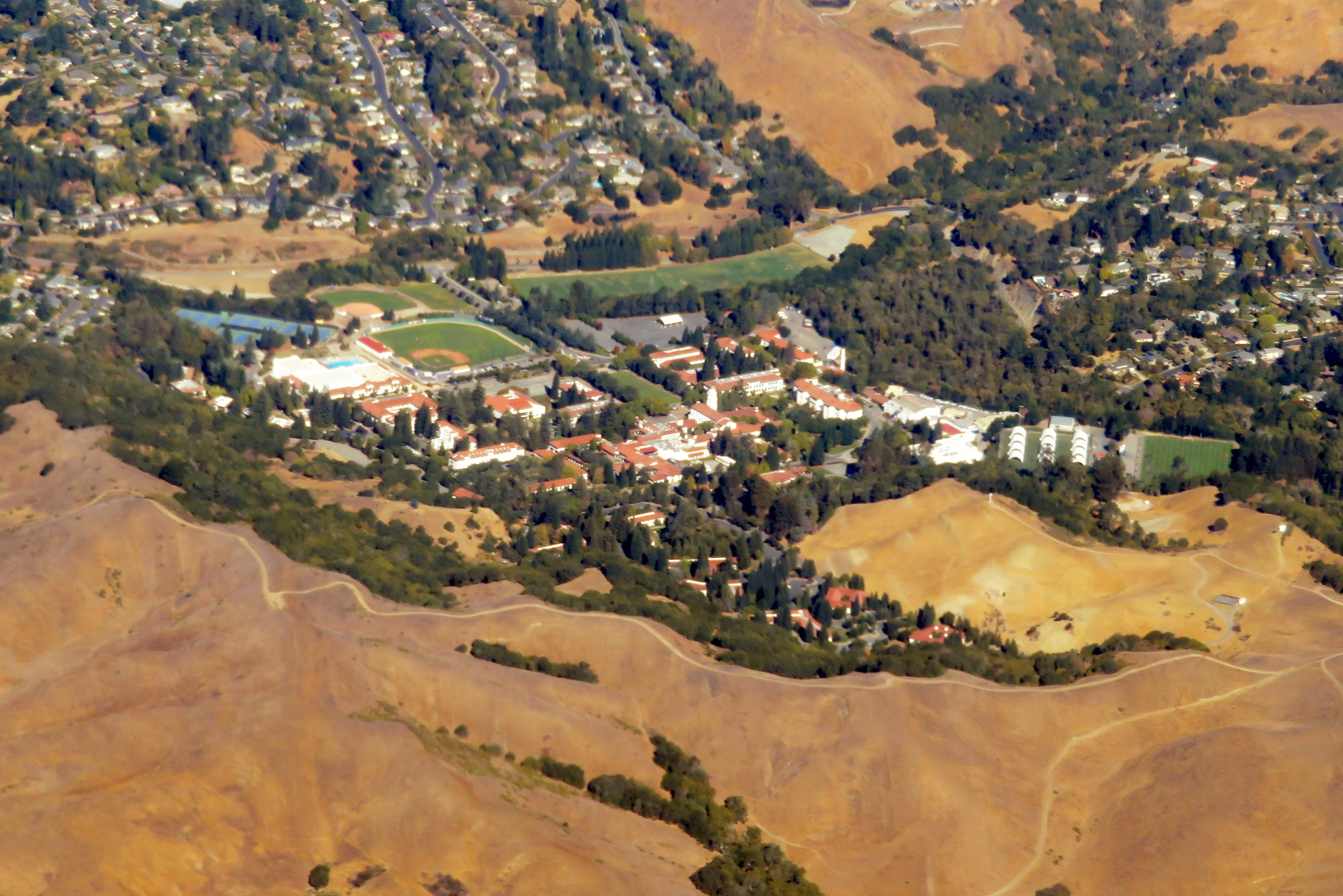
Aerial view of St. Mary's

St. Mary's historic campus is located in Moraga, California. The majority of the principal buildings on campus are built in the California Churrigueresque style, while the rest of campus is made up of other styles of Spanish Colonial Revival architecture or Mission Revival architecture.

All first-year students at Saint Mary's live on campus. 55% of the total student population lives on campus. There are six first year residence halls (Augustine, Justin, Mitty, De La Salle, Aquinas and Assumption Halls). All first year residence halls (with the exception of Aquinas) are set up "community style," in which two or three students usually share a room and the entire floor shares a central bathroom. Floors are usually separated by sex in first year halls (because of the shared bathrooms). The only exceptions are Aquinas hall which has students live in suites with their own bathroom, and the first floor of Assumption, which is coeducational with separate bathrooms for each sex. Currently, first years living on campus are guaranteed a spot on campus for their second year. Sophomores live in Becket Hall, More Hall, North and South Claeys Halls, and Ageno A, B, and C Halls. All of these halls are "suite" style living and each suite comes with three or four bedrooms, accommodates six students, and has its own bathroom and shower. Floors on suite buildings are co-ed. Juniors and seniors enter into a housing lottery to determine if they can live on campus. Many upperclassmen live in "townhouse" buildings: Ageno East and West, Guerreri East and West, Freitas, Thille, Syufy and Sabatte Halls. All townhouses come with two or three bedrooms (accommodating five to six students), a bathroom and shower, kitchen and living room. Upperclassmen also live off-campus in Moraga, Orinda, Lafayette, and Walnut Creek. Upperclassmen resident advisers, as well as a few other upperclassmen, live in the traditionally freshman and sophomore halls. All residence hall rooms are fully furnished and come with two phones with free long distance, free Internet, and free TV cable outlet. Others often choose to live at home if they are within half an hour of campus. In addition to several student resident advisers, each residence hall also has at least one resident director, who is a Brother or a faculty or staff member and lives in the residence hall.

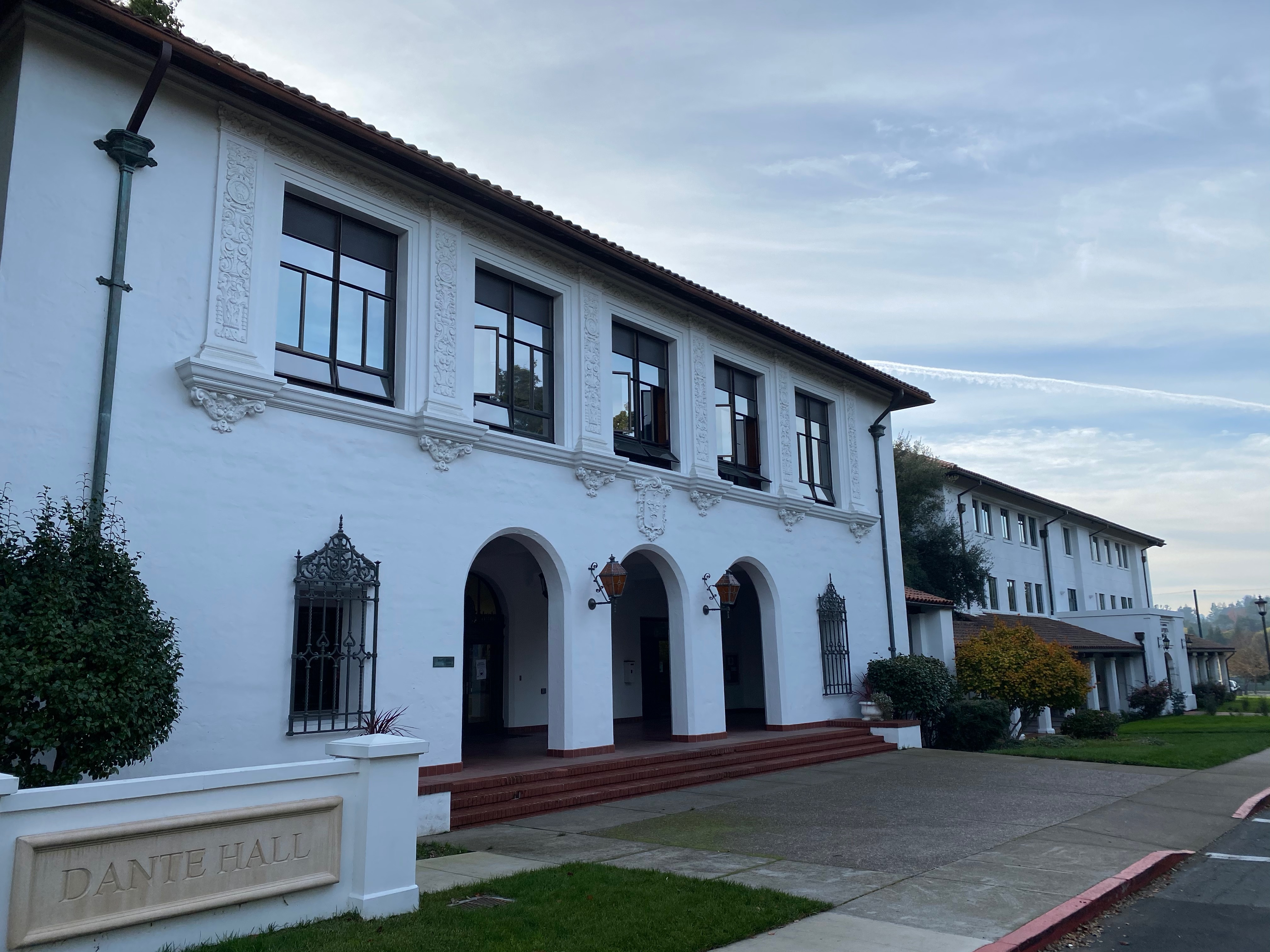
Dante Hall

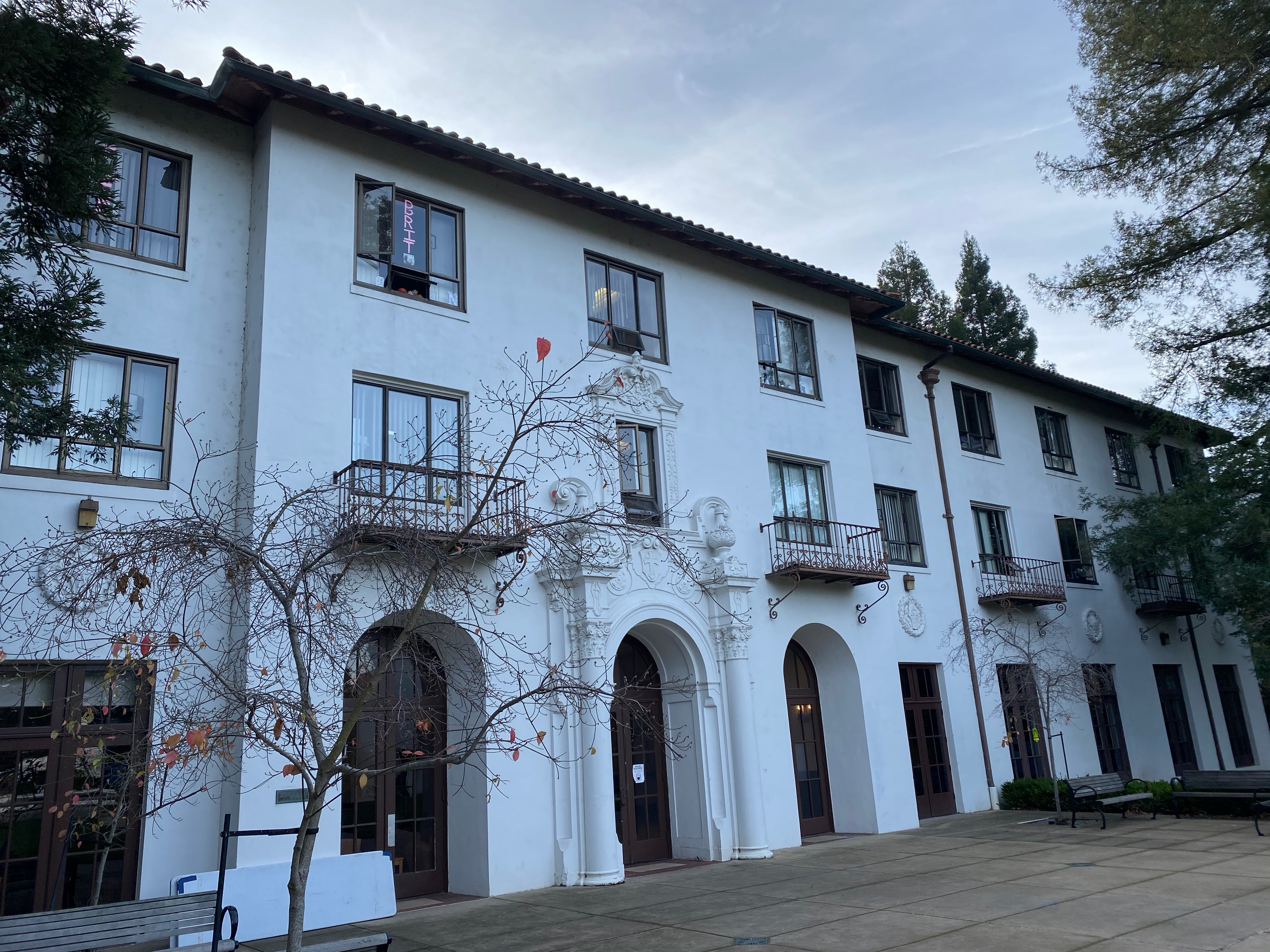
De La Salle Hall

There are four Living Learning Communities on campus. The Honors/Science living learning community is available only for first years and is located in Assumption Hall. Live-in tutors specializing in the sciences and the humanities – along with live-in faculty – help to create this intellectually stimulating and supportive community. The International Community is located in Claeys Hall North, where both international and domestic students can learn skills important in both cross-cultural communication and living globally. The Lasallian Community is a community of sophomores living in Becket Hall. They participate in a class, service and community time together and are focused on learning the life and principles of Saint John Baptist De La Salle. The Santiago Community is a community of juniors and Seniors living in Ageno West who are focused on a Faith, Service, and Community aspect, and learning about James Santiago Miller who died when his work to educate the poor came in opposition to the military powers.

The majority of classes are held in Galileo, Dante and Garaventa halls, which each have three floors. Most of the professors' offices are also in these halls. A science building, known as Brousseau Hall was built in 2000. Sichel Hall is a smaller, media-oriented classroom building used by the Communication Department, and Syufy Performing Arts Hall houses large and small practice rooms for arts students. The newest building on campus is Filippi Academic Hall, which houses the School of Education. The library, St. Albert Hall, is located near the freshmen dorms.

The cafeteria is called Oliver Hall and its neighbor, Dryden Hall has recently been retrofitted into overflow seating for Oliver Hall and is also used for other events around campus. The Cassin Student Union is a student lounge, adjacent to Dryden. Attached to Cassin is Café Louis, a coffee shop, which is operated by Sodexo, the same company that runs the dining hall. Other spaces often used by students are the Delphine Intercultural Center, the Women's Resource Center and the bookstore.

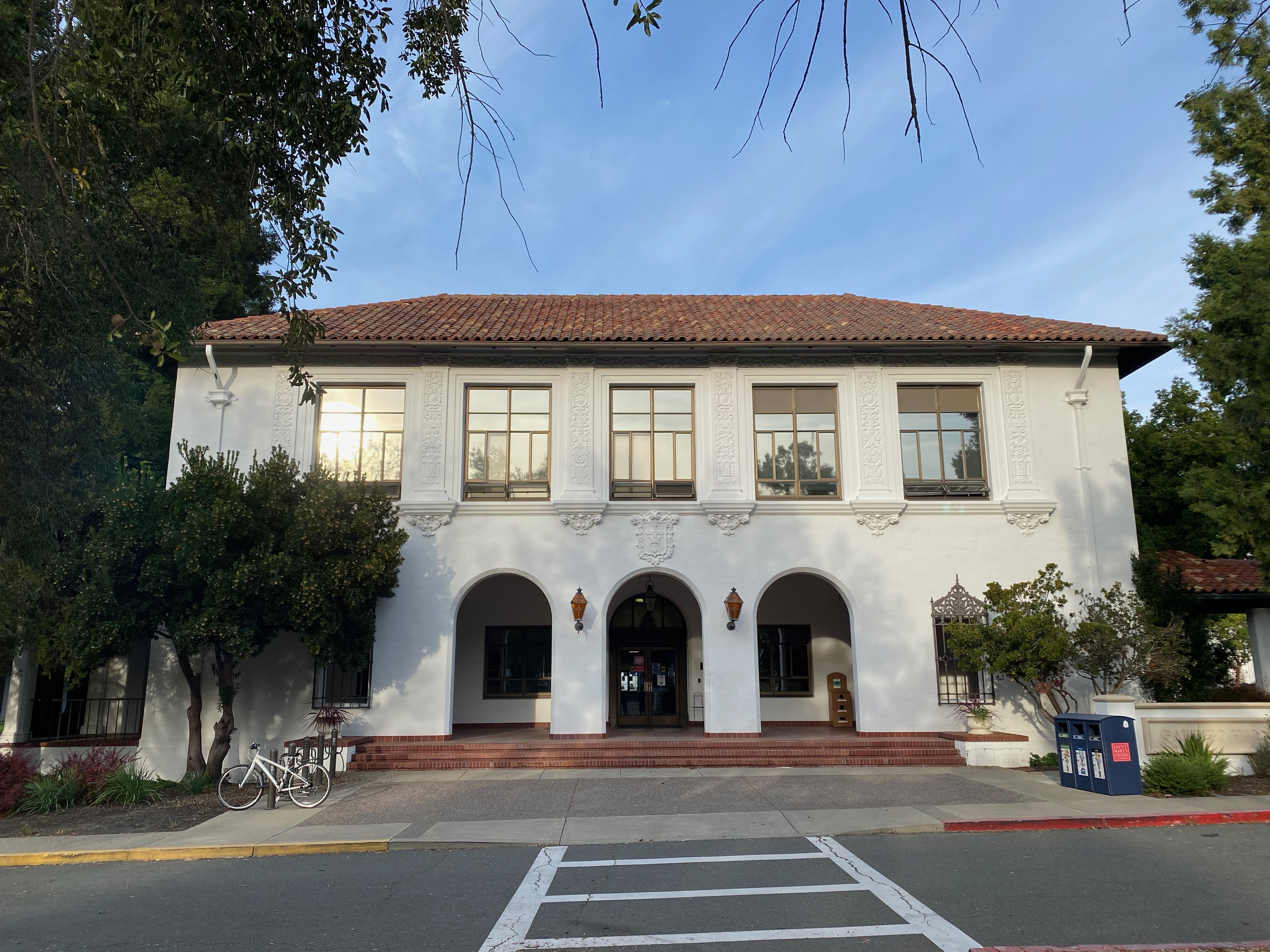
Galileo Hall.

Athletics facilities include McKeon Pavilion (basketball and volleyball), Saint Mary's Stadium (soccer and rugby), Madigan Gym, Louis Guisto Field (baseball), Cottrell Field (softball) as well as additional soccer, rugby and intramural fields. The college also operates Timothy Korth Tennis Complex and frequently hosts conference, area and regional tennis tournaments. In March 2015, the college opened the new 50,000-square-foot (4,600 m^{2}) Joseph L. Alioto Recreation Center.

Two other important buildings are the Soda Activity Center and the Lefevre Theatre, where various events are held. There is also St. Albert Hall Library and the Brother Cornelius Art Center, which houses both classrooms and the Saint Mary's College Museum of Art. All buildings on campus except Assumption Hall are named after an important person in the Catholic religion or a person important to the school.

There is a cross at the top of a hill on campus and a large concrete "SMC" on top of one of the surrounding hills, which gets painted frequently by student groups around campus.

== Museum of Art ==
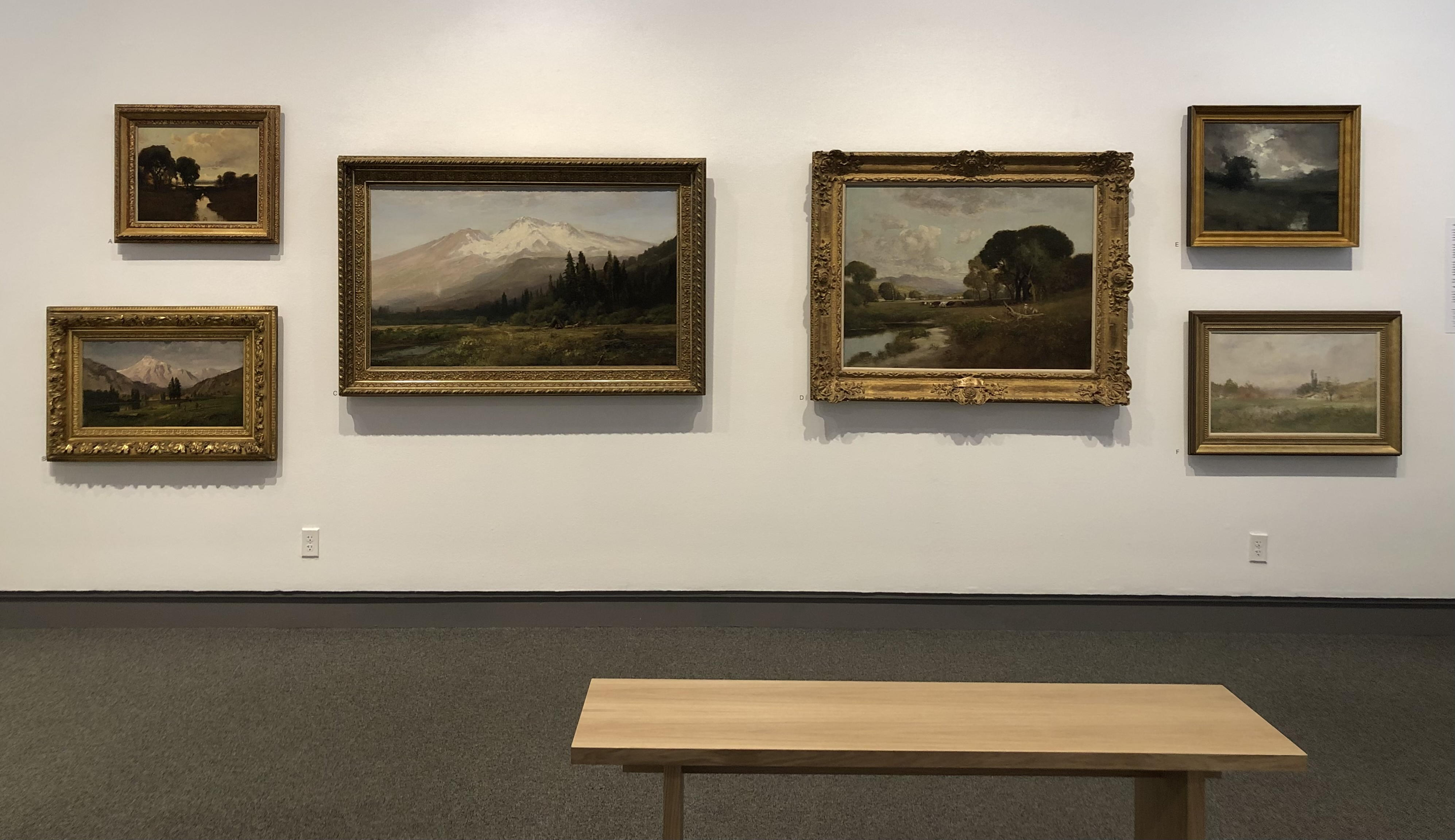
Six paintings by William Keith on display in the museum, March 2024. Photo by Steven Saylor

Saint Mary's College of California began collecting art in the early 20th century. Founded by professor Brother Fidelis Cornelius Braeg in 1934, the William Keith Gallery exhibited the museum's collection of paintings by the renowned California landscape artist, who lived from 1838 to 1911. Brother Cornelius wrote Old Master of California, a biography of Keith, after years or working directly with the artist's widow, Mary McHenry Keith.

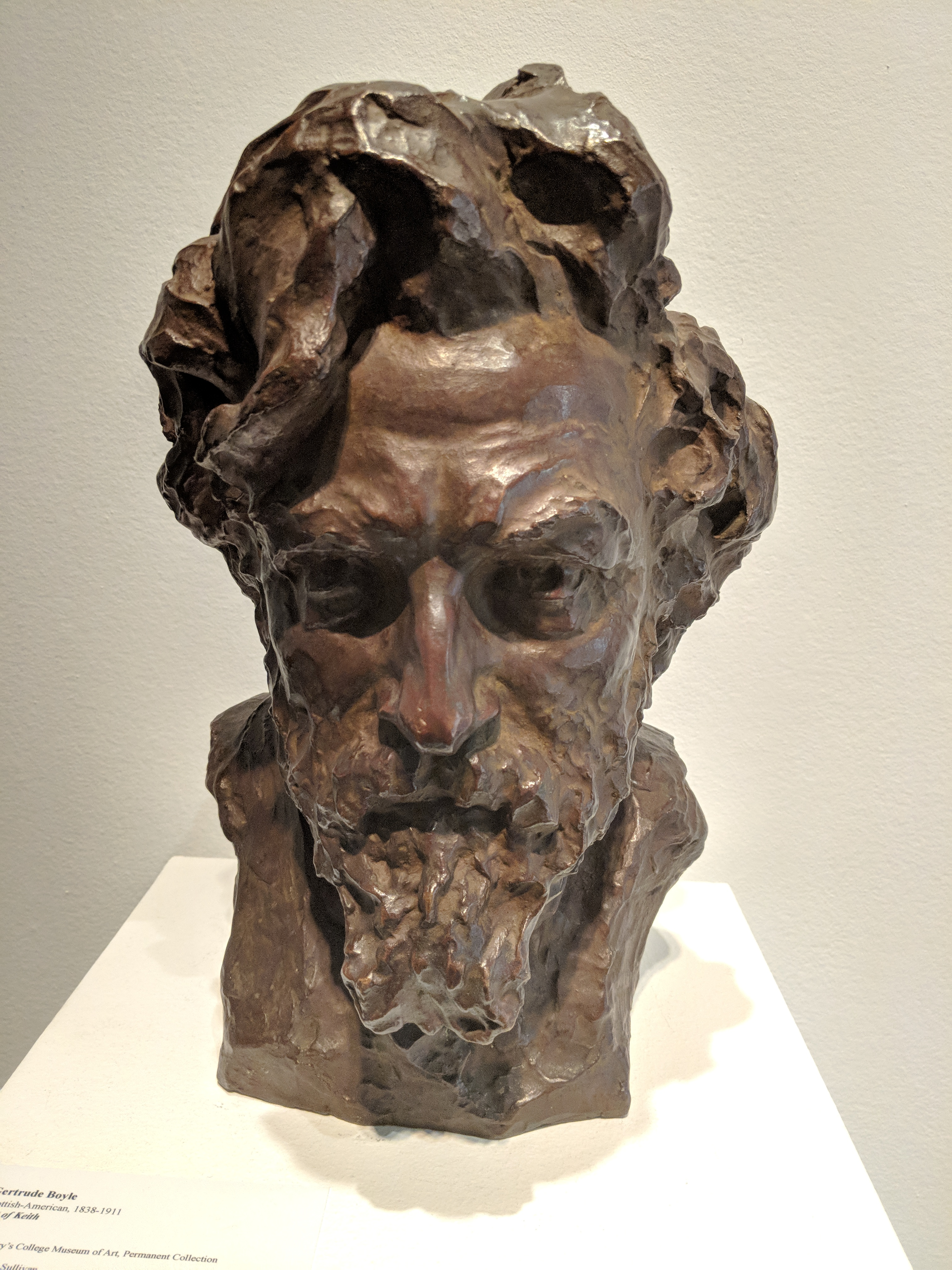
Gertrude Boyle Kanno, Bust of William Keith, 1904. Photo by Jim Heaphy.

The gallery was expanded in 1977 with a grant from the Hearst Art Foundation and reopened as the Hearst Art Gallery. Through this expansion, the gallery began exhibiting ethnographic materials and works by Western artists.

In 2011, the Hearst Art Gallery completed an extensive renovation and expansion project, and was renamed Saint Maryʼs College Museum of Art (SMCMoA). In 2021, the museum was awarded accreditation by the American Alliance of Museums, the highest national recognition afforded to museums in the United States; of over 1000 museums in California, SMCMoA is one of only 77 accredited.

SMCMoA cares for a permanent collection of over 5000 objects including the William Keith Collection, the most comprehensive collection of the artist's work, with over 200 objects. The museum rotates exhibitions twice a year, showcasing the permanent collection, traveling exhibitions, and emerging California artists.

The museum is located in the Brother Cornelius Art Center. All exhibitions and public programs are free and open to the public, and the facility is ADA accessible.

== Student life ==
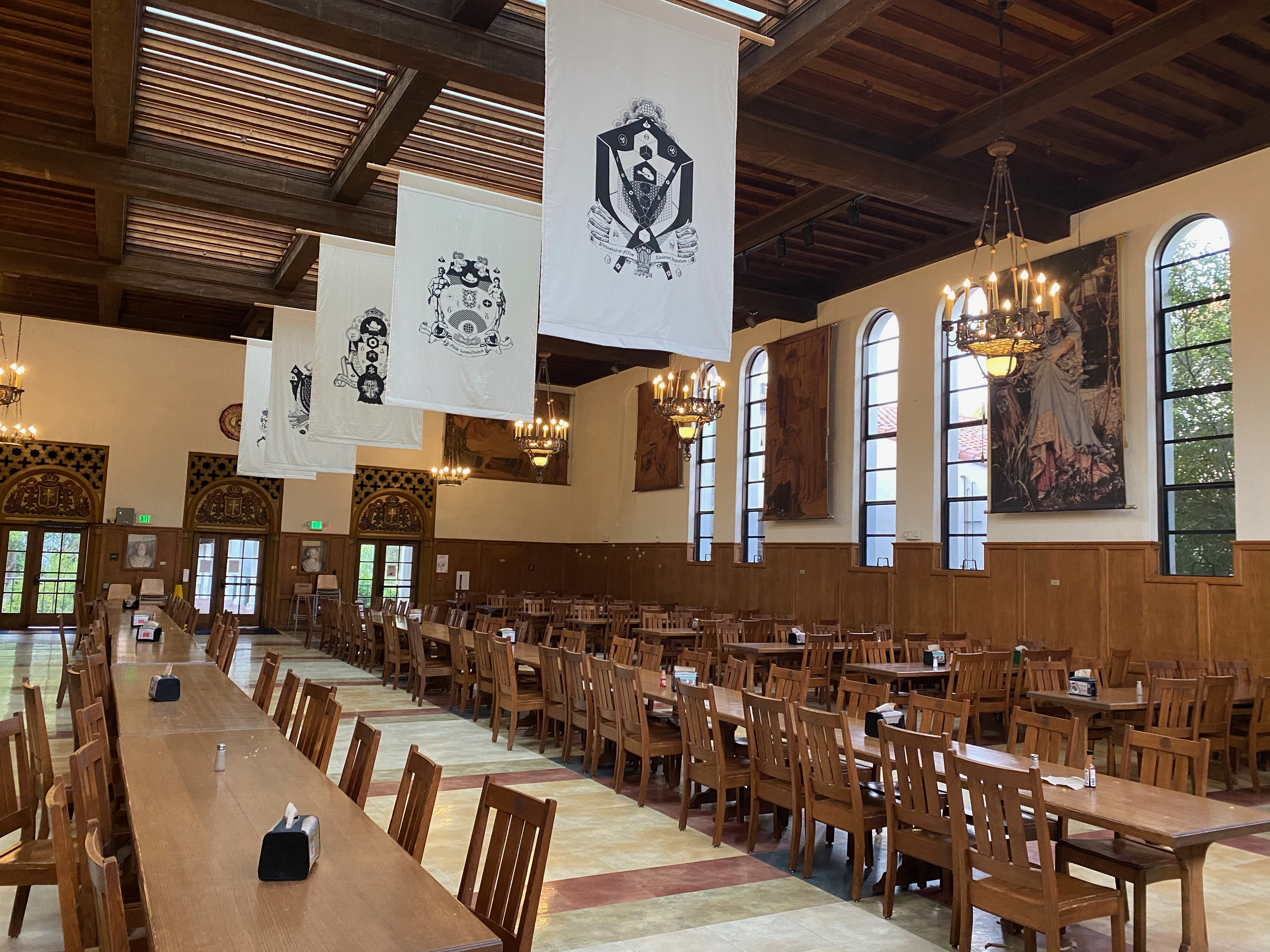
Oliver Hall, the dining hall

As a Lasallian school, community service plays a big role on campus. The Catholic Institute for Lasallian Social Action coordinates most service work on campus, and each year students perform many hours of community service. On the first Saturday of every other month, they have the opportunity to participate in "Saturday of Service" where Saint Mary's students branch out all across the Bay Area and serve their community.

== Athletics ==
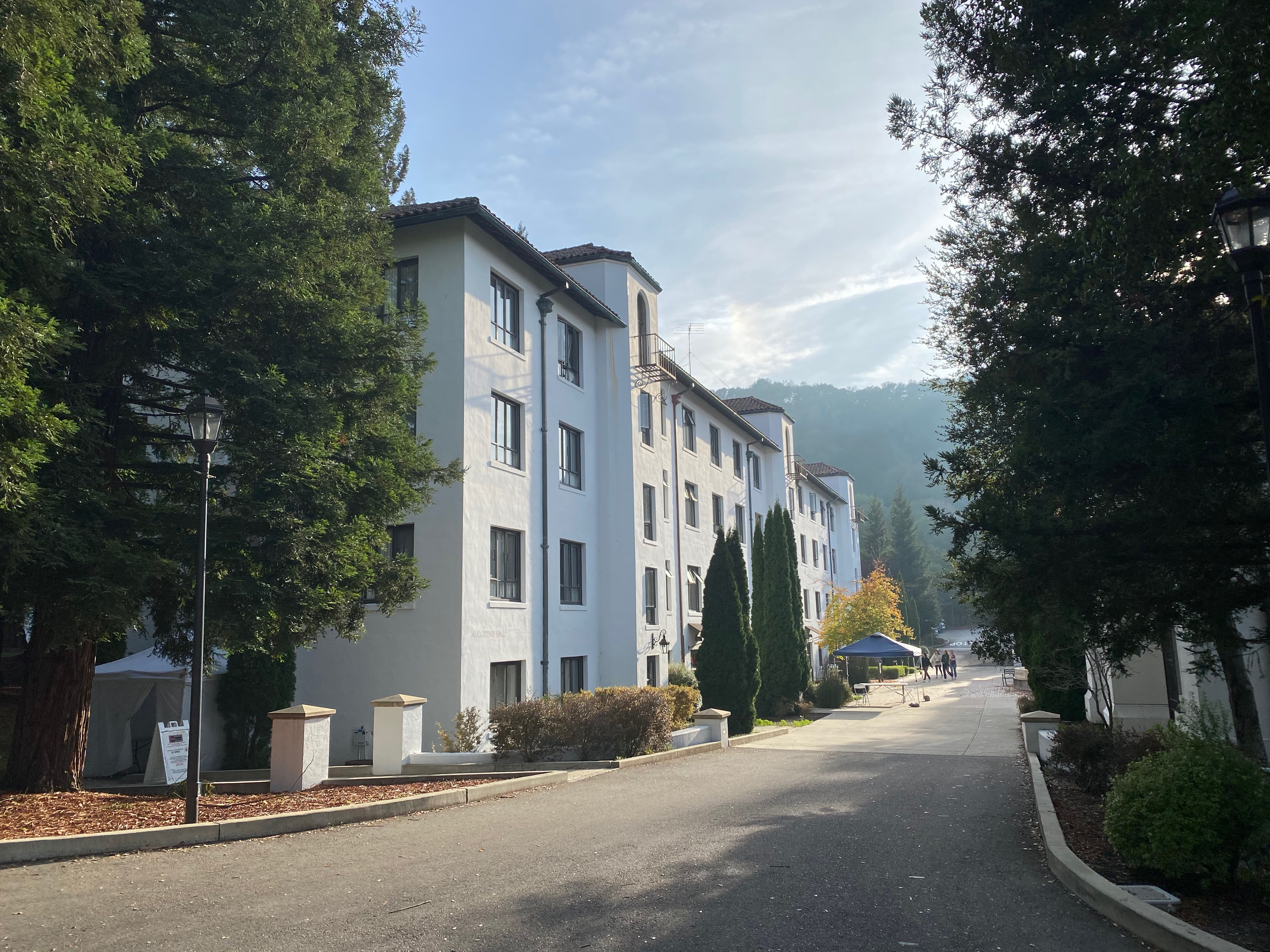
Augustine Hall

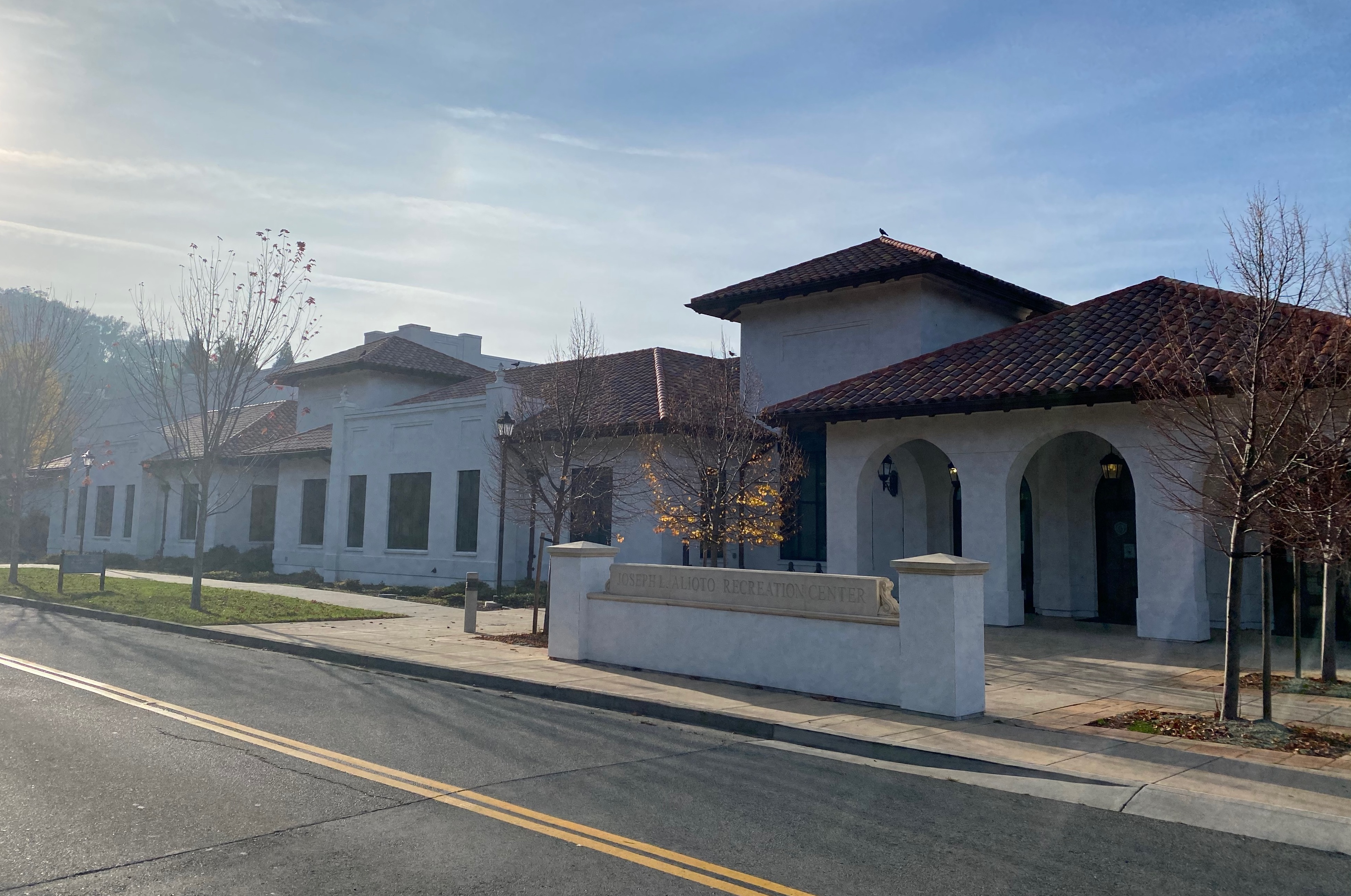
Alioto Recreation Center

Saint Mary's has 17 Division I teams, competing in the West Coast Conference. The nickname of Saint Mary's sports teams is the Gaels, which had been given to the school's football team in 1926 by Pat Frayne, a writer for the San Francisco Call-Bulletin. The school's previous nickname was the Saints although the baseball team still kept the nickname the Phoenix up until the 1940s.

The men's basketball team is recognized nationally as one of the top mid-major programs in the country; in 2010, it made it to the NCAA Sweet Sixteen.

The Gaels are also known for their strong pursuit of Australian talent, such as NBA players Patty Mills and Matthew Dellavedova. Chants such as "Aussie Aussie Aussie, Oi Oi Oi" are common among students, and an Australian flag now hangs from the back wall of Saint Mary's basketball arena, McKeon Pavilion during games. This has also given the college a big following in Australia, with most basketball games shown on ESPN Australia/New Zealand. Point guard Matthew Dellavedova was named WCC Player of the Year in 2012 and became the first male athlete at Saint Mary's to earn first-team Capital One Academic All-America honors. In 2013, he broke school records becoming the all-time leader in scoring, assists, and three-pointers.

In 2011, the men's soccer team won the West Coast Conference title, beating the University of San Diego, 1–0, giving Saint Mary's an automatic bid into the NCAA Tournament and their first-ever WCC title. In the first round Saint Mary's defeated No. 25 CSU Bakersfield 1–0 to send them to the next round. The second round was played against UC Irvine. The Gaels defeated the No. 7 Anteaters, 2–1, in double overtime. The game-winning goal was headed in by Justin Howard in the 103rd minute, sending Saint Mary's into the "Sweet Sixteen". The third round of the NCAA Tournament saw the Gaels against Brown University, beating the Bears in overtime 3–2, at Stevenson Field. The win over the Bears sent the Gaels into the "Elite Eight," making it only the second team in school history to make it to the Elite Eight along with the 1959 men's basketball team. Saint Mary's lost to the University of North Carolina in the Quarter Finals, 2–0. The participation of the men's soccer team in the 2011 NCAA Tournament was the most successful postseason run in Saint Mary's history.

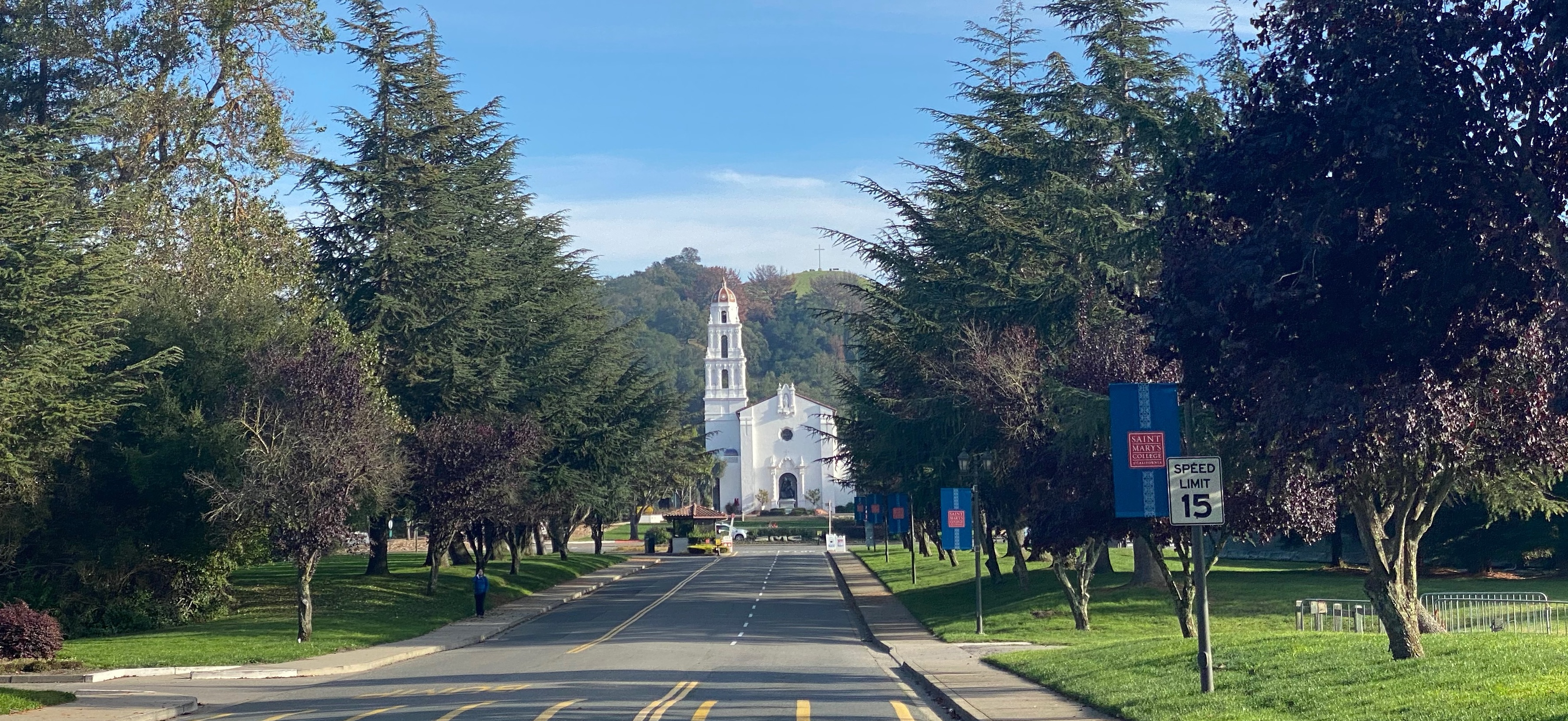
View down St. Mary's Parkway

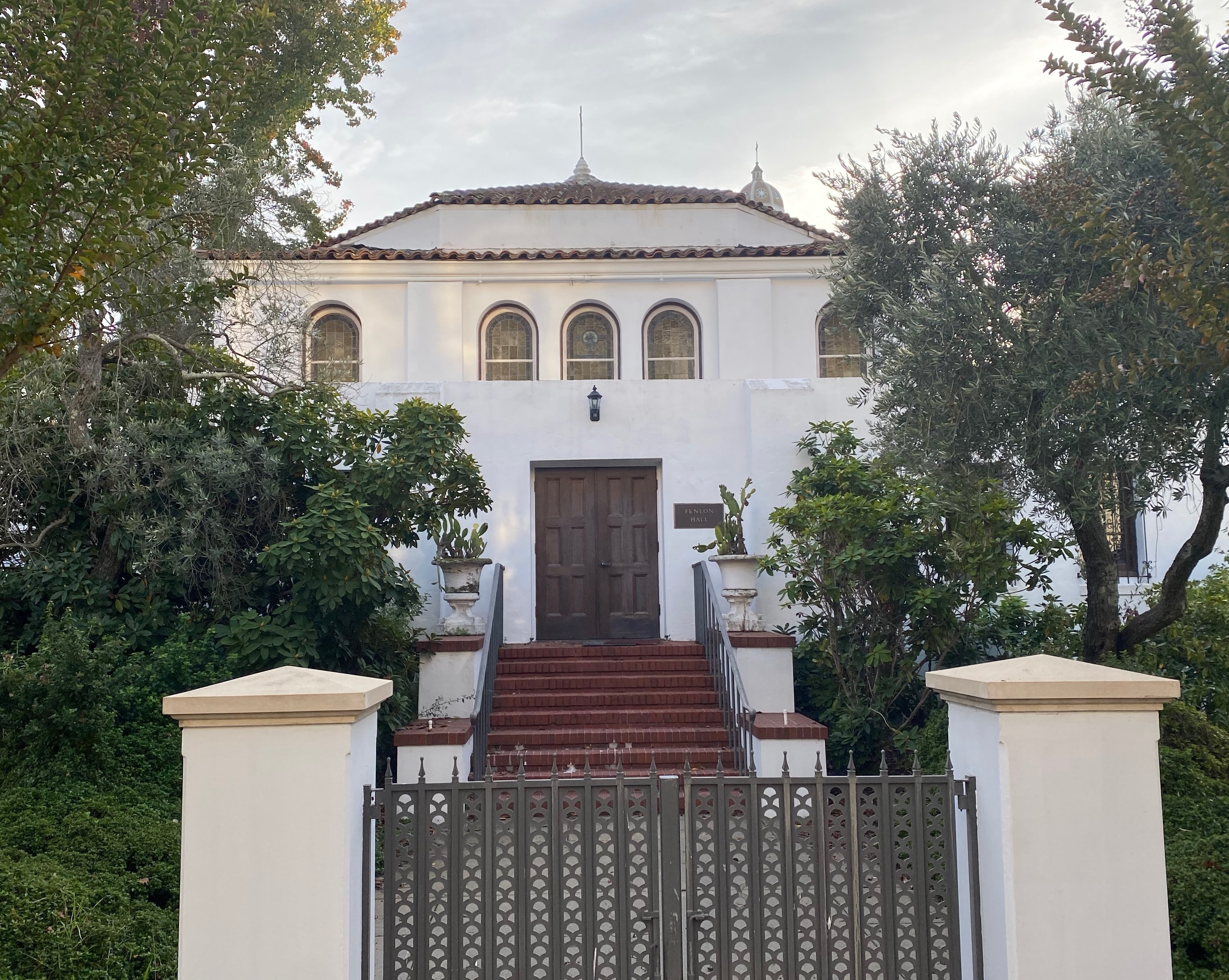
Fenlon Hall

In 2012, the Gaels' golf team took the program's first-ever WCC title, and junior Ben Geyer became just the fourth Saint Mary's player to take home medalist honors in the tournament's 41-year history. Head coach Scott Hardy earned his seventh WCC Coach of the Year honor after leading the team to the 2013 title – the first back-to-back championship in program history. He earned his eight WCC Coach of the Year honors in 2015.

In 2001, the women's basketball and soccer teams competed in their NCAA tournaments, with both teams advancing to the second round. The women's volleyball team advanced to the "Sweet Sixteen" in 2004. Women's tennis, softball and volleyball won the WCC Conference championships and went on to play in NCAA postseason tournaments. The 2010 and 2013 women's tennis teams won WCC championships and the program has advanced to 4-straight NCAA tournaments, the most consecutive invitations to NCAA tournament play of any Saint Mary's athletic program.

Saint Mary's College was once known for its American football team led by Edward "Slip" Madigan, which dominated west coast football, indeed beating USC and California during the thirties, and with several wins against eastern powerhouses during the 20s, 30s, and 40s including winning the 1939 Cotton Bowl by narrowly defeating favored Texas Tech 20 to 13. The Gaels were known for their flashy style that reflected the personality of their flamboyant coach. Madigan traveled to New York for the Fordham game with 150 fans on a train that was labelled "the world's longest bar." To stir up publicity for the game, he threw a party the night before and invited not only sportswriters, but such celebrities as Babe Ruth and New York mayor Jimmy Walker. They dropped the sport in 2004.

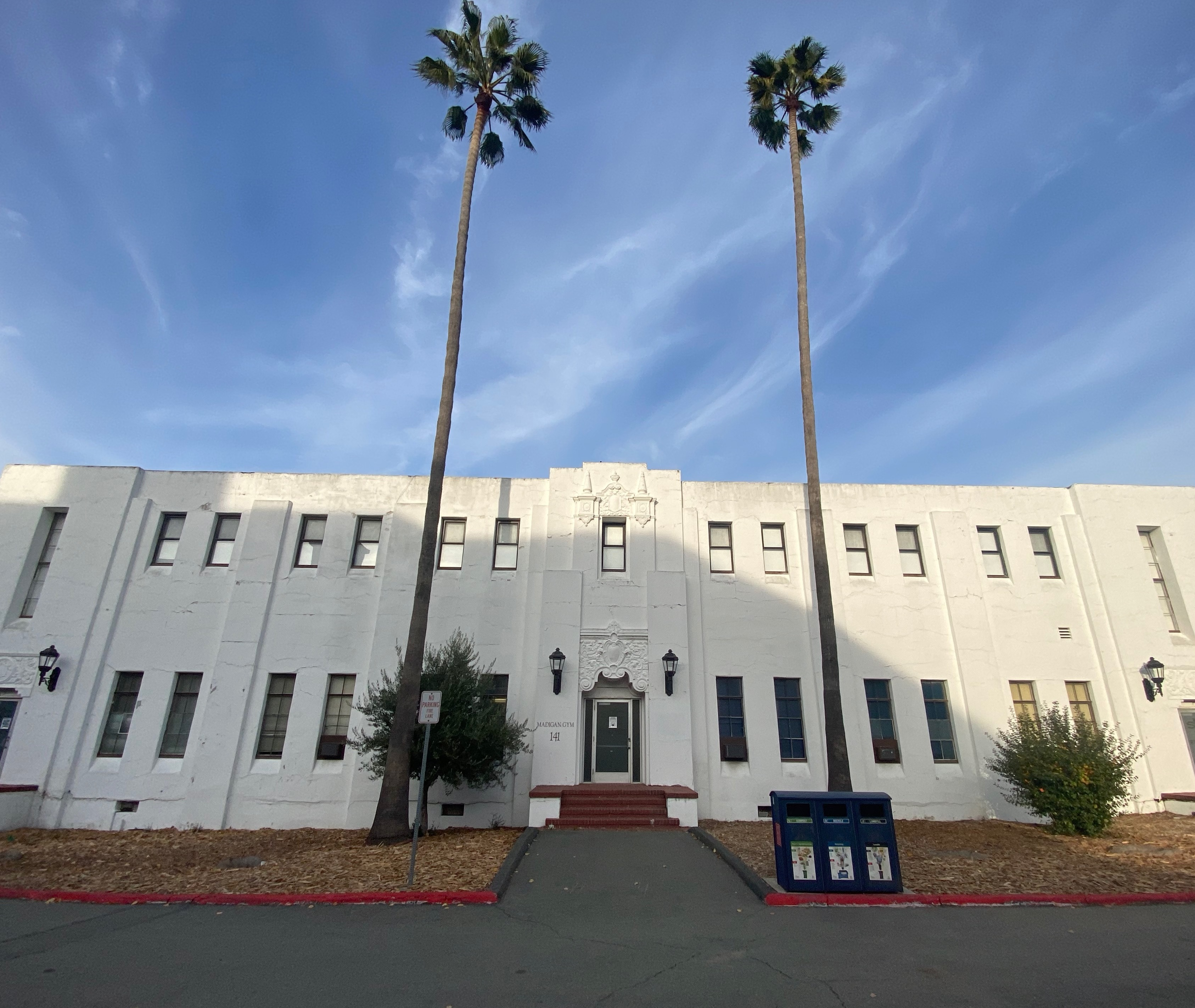
Madigan Gymnasium

Currently, 60% of the students who attend Saint Mary's are involved with organized athletics. There are 13 club sports teams that they have the opportunity to participate in as well as Intramural teams and NCAA. Student-athletes from Saint Mary's graduate at the second-highest success rate among all California Division 1 Institutions, according to data released by NCAA.

Another successful sports program at Saint Mary's is rugby, which, though not well known in the United States generally, is the oldest athletic club at Saint Mary's. The men's rugby team enjoyed a rise in the past few years and won the school's first national championship on May 10, 2014, beating Life University 21–6 to win the USA Rugby D1A title at Stanford University. The team frequently is ranked among the top teams in the country, competing with large high-profile schools such as California, Ohio State, and the military academies. In 2008, it reached the Final Four of the USA Rugby Division One National Championship tournament, losing to California 41–31 in the semi-finals, and was also ranked at #2 in the nation for Division 1 Collegiate Rugby at the season's end. In 2011, it competed in the National 7s and in 2012, after beating No.1 ranked California 20 –18 in Moraga, the team finished the regular season undefeated in the Pacific Coast Conference and ranked No. 2 in the country. It defeated Utah 25–15 in the D1-A quarterfinals before falling to Arkansas State in the semifinals. In 2015, the Saint Mary's Men's Rugby team clinched the national D1-A title for the second year in a row when it beat Life University 30-24 at Kennesaw State University in Georgia.

== Notable alumni ==
Notable alumni of Saint Mary's College of California

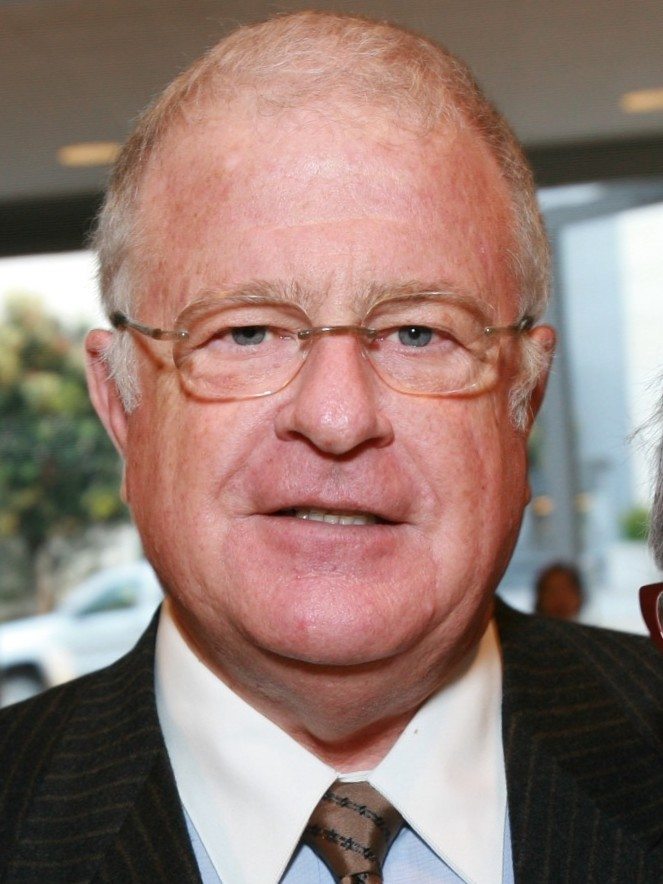
Don Perata, former President pro tempore of the California State Senate

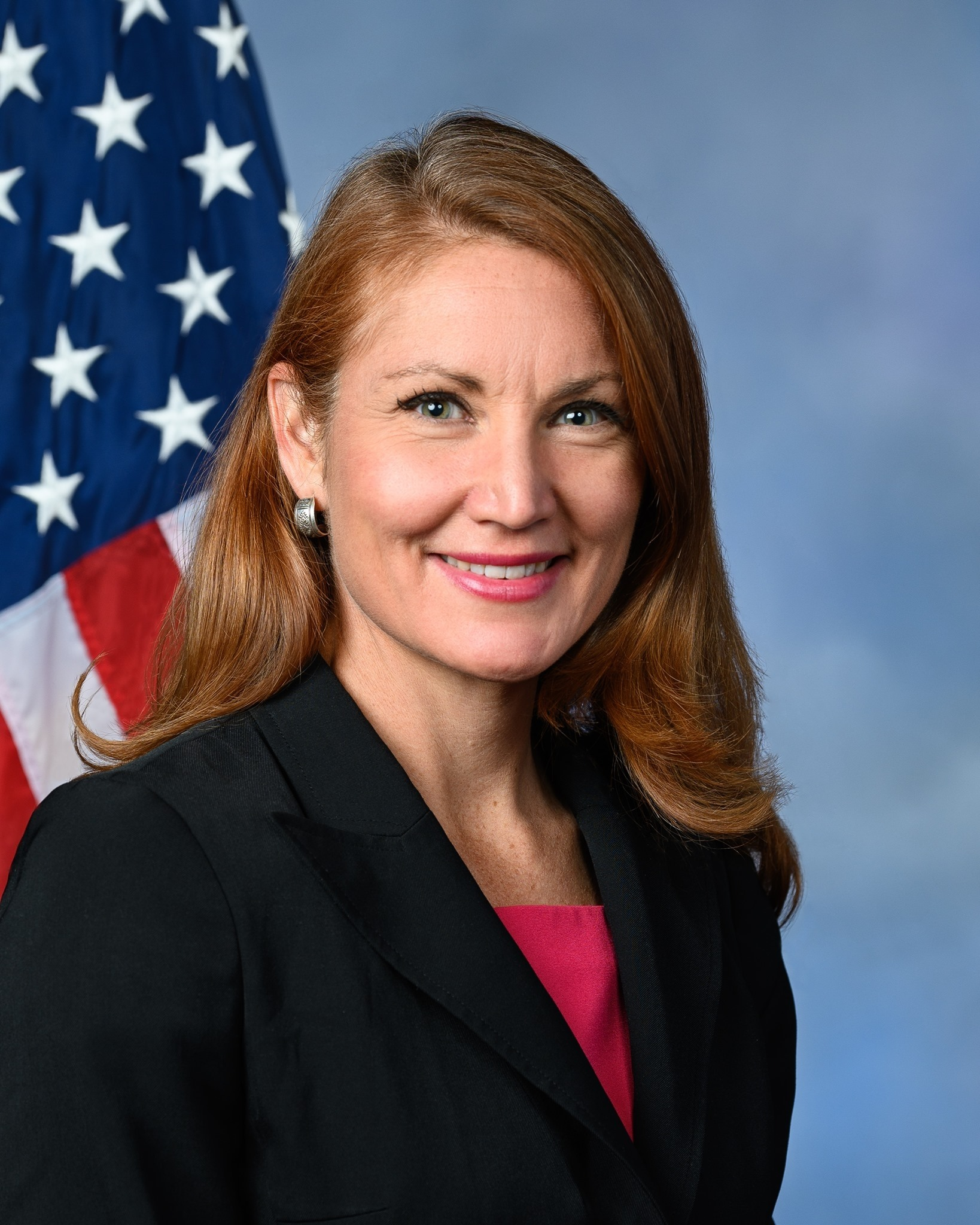
Melanie Stansbury, current Congresswoman from New Mexico

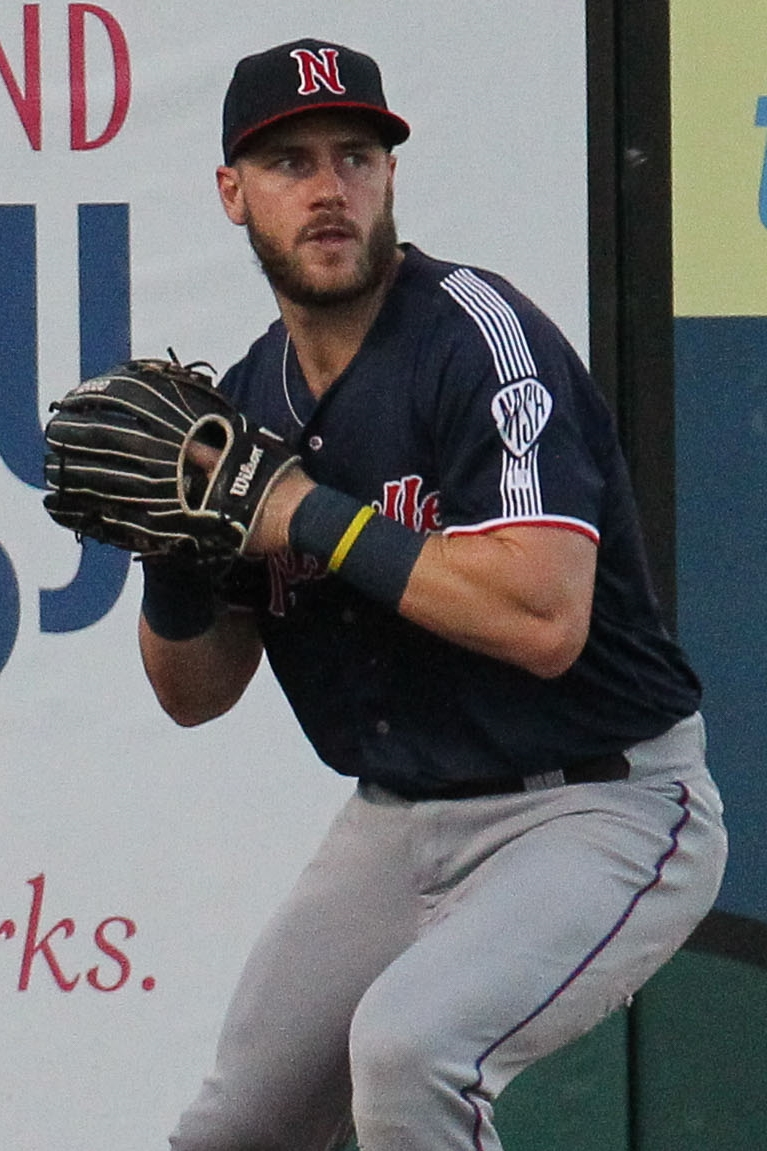
Patrick Wisdom, player for the Chicago Cubs

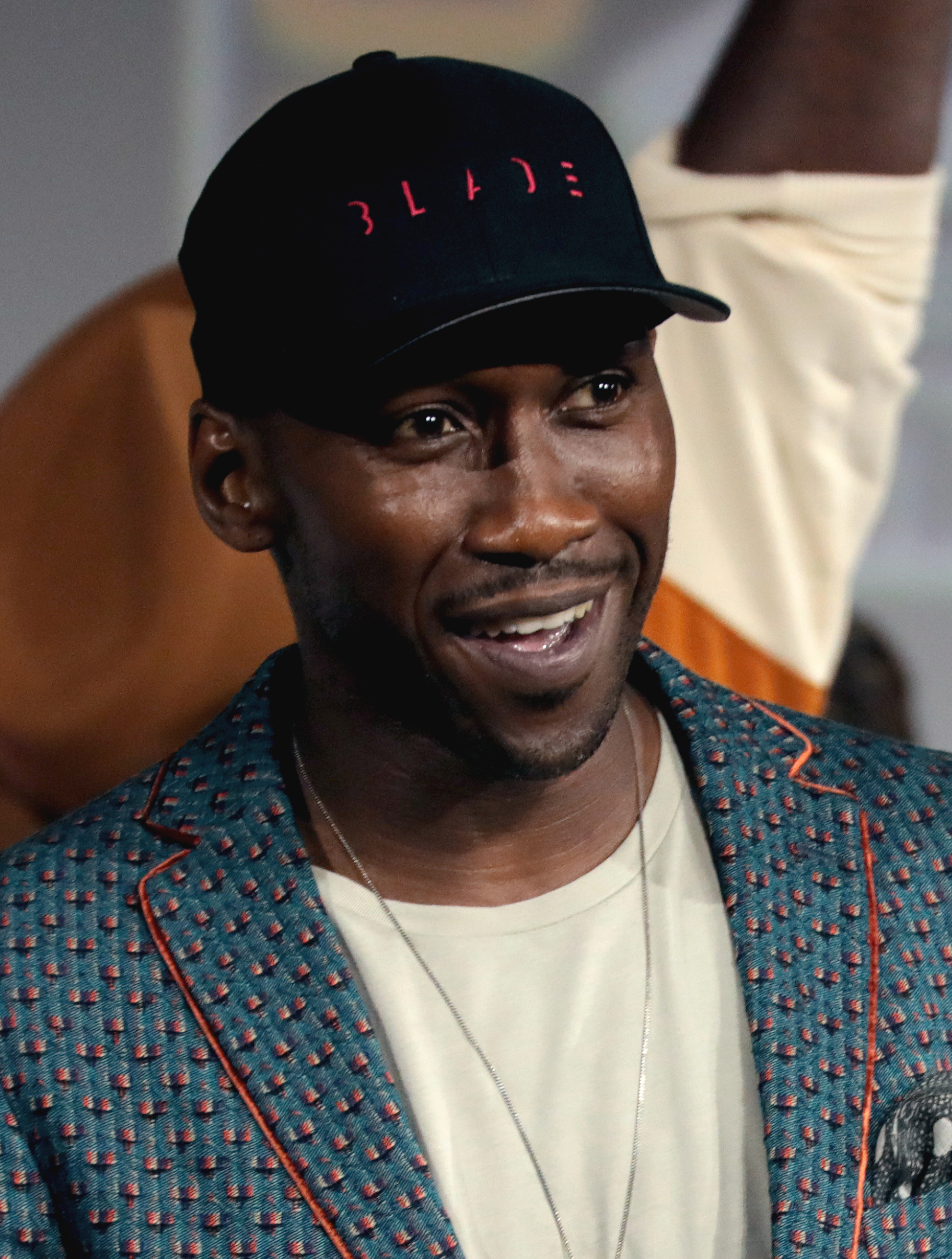
Mahershala Ali, Golden Globe and Academy Award winning actor

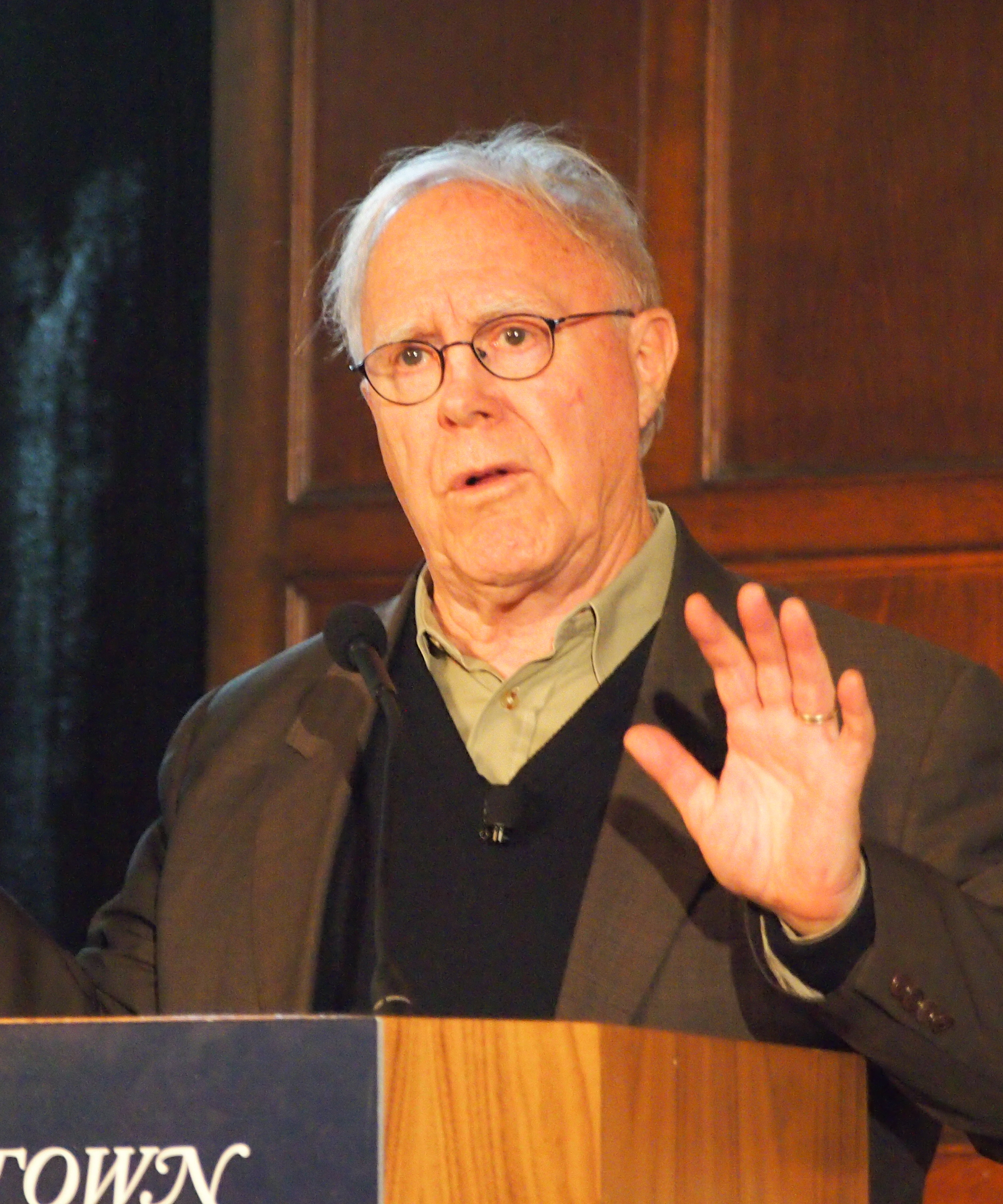
Robert Hass, former Poet Laureate of the United States

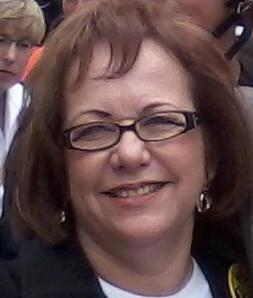
María Elena Durazo, member of the California State Senate

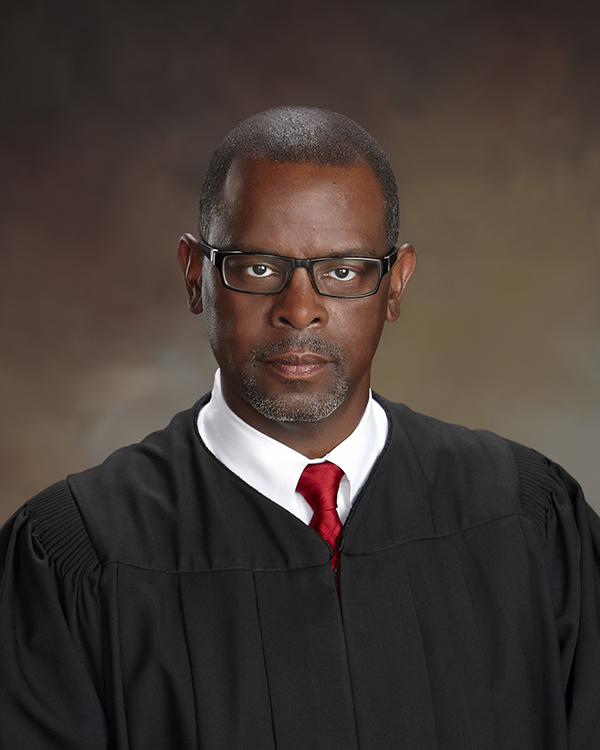
Troy L. Nunley, U.S. Judge for the Eastern District of California

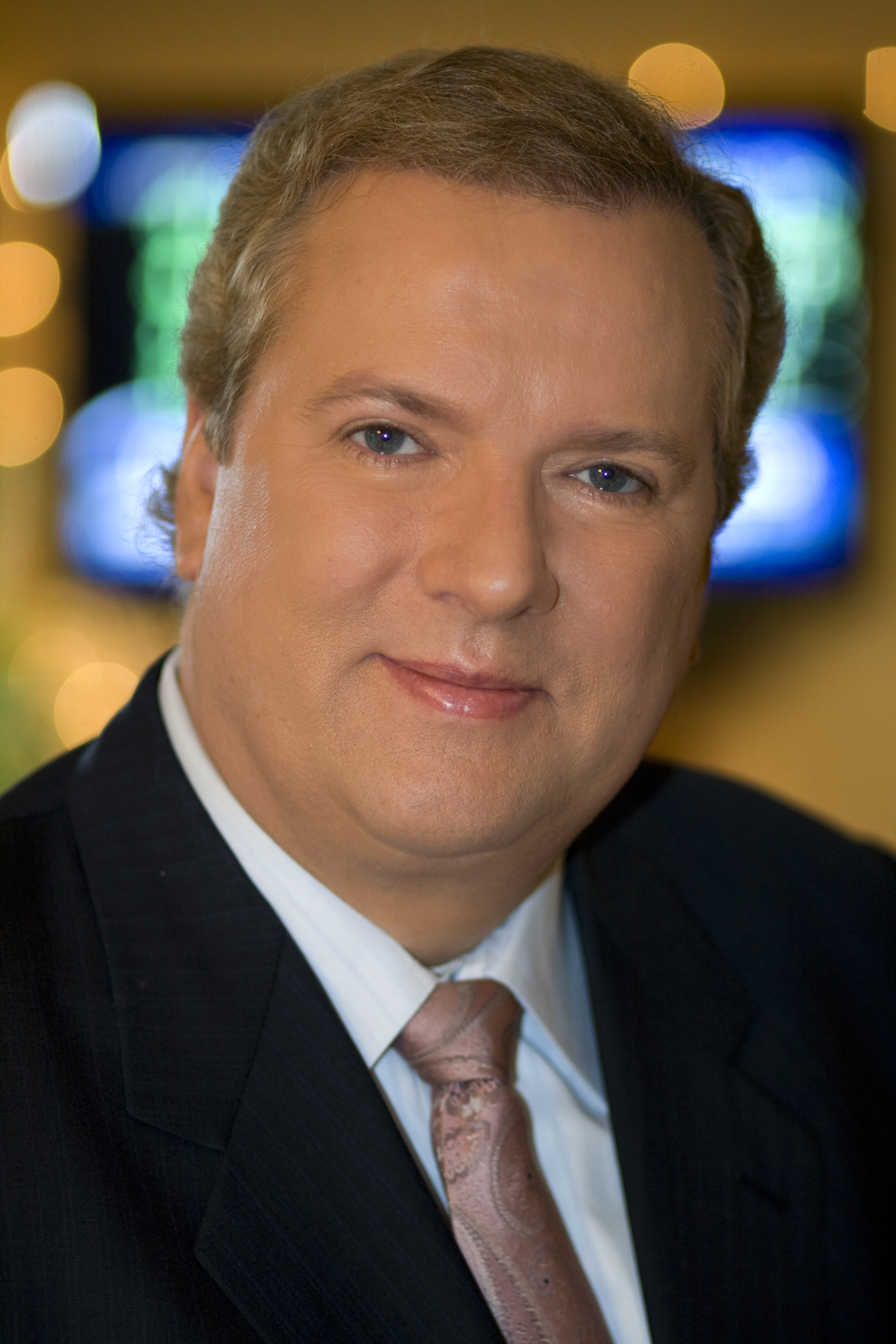
Mark Curtis, Chief Political Reporter for Nexstar Media Group

Some of Saint Mary's notable alumni include:

- Mahershala Ali, actor
- Rose Aguilar, journalist
- Joseph Alioto, politician
- Kyle Barraclough, professional baseball player
- María Elena Durazo, politician
- John Bromfield, American actor and commercial fisherman
- Alfred Brousseau, mathematician
- Corbin Burnes, professional baseball player
- Tom Candiotti, professional baseball player
- Adam Caporn, professional basketball player and coach
- Pete Constant, politician
- Mark Curtis, news anchor, reporter, author, and political analyst
- Bob Delaney, professional basketball official
- Matthew Dellavedova, professional basketball player
- Brian Doyle-Murray, comedian, screenwriter, actor, and voice actor
- Don Ferrarese, professional baseball player
- Jim Garrett, professional football coach and scout
- Todd Golden, college basketball coach
- Tony Gonsolin, professional baseball player
- LaDonna Harris, law enforcement officer
- Robert Hass, poet
- Von Hayes, professional baseball player and manager
- John F. Henning, politician
- Ken Hofmann, business executive
- Harry Hooper, professional baseball player
- Guy Houston, politician
- Bill Howerton, professional baseball player
- J. J. Jelincic, labor official
- John Henry Johnson, professional football player
- Frank Kudelka, professional basketball player
- Richard E. Ladner, computer scientist
- Bob Ladouceur, college football coach
- Mickey McConnell, professional baseball and basketball player
- Tony Martin (1935), entertainer and big band singer
- John McLiam, actor
- Tom Meschery, professional basketball player, teacher, and poet
- George P. Miller, politician
- Patty Mills, professional basketball player
- Pete Morelli, professional football official and high school administrator
- Troy L. Nunley, judge
- Kaya Oakes, writer, poet, and professor
- Don Perata, politician
- Tami Reller, business executive
- Greg Reyes, business executive
- Karl Schnell, professional baseball player
- Jason Shellen, business executive
- Diamon Simpson, professional basketball player
- Melanie Stansbury, scientist and politician
- Tracee Talavera, gymnast
- Mark Teahen, professional baseball player
- Louella Tomlinson, professional basketball player
- Ken Waldichuk, professional baseball player
- Diane Whipple, lacrosse player and coach
- Patrick Wisdom, professional baseball player
- Carl Wu (1974), biologist

== See also ==
- List of World War II military service football teams
- Association for Core Texts and Courses, headquartered at Saint Mary's
- Lasallian educational institutions
