= Association for Core Texts and Courses =

The Association for Core Texts and Courses (ACTC) is a global association of colleges and universities supporting the use of classic texts and core curricula in undergraduate education. It is headquartered at Mercer University. It is broadly associated with general education.

Members range from tiny institutions with a single curriculum, such as Deep Springs College (26 students), to large universities like Columbia University that offer a core curriculum or dedicated Great Books program. Although the majority of member institutions are in the United States, the ACTC also has member institutions in Canada, China, Guatemala, and Iraq.

The ACTC was organized in the course of the 1994-1995 academic year, and held its first conference in 1995.

== Member institutions ==
As of the 2014-2015 academic year, the ACTC has upwards of 60 institutional members:

- American University in Iraq
- Assumption University
- Austin College
- Baylor University
- Benedictine University
- Boston College
- Boston University
- Carleton University (Canada)
- Carthage College
- Chinese University of Hong Kong
- College of Mount Saint Vincent
- Colgate University
- Columbia University
- Concordia University—Liberal Arts College (Canada)
- Concordia University, Irvine
- Deep Springs College
- Dharma Realm Buddhist University
- Fresno Pacific University
- Hillsdale College
- James Madison University
- Kansas State University
- Lewis and Clark College
- Longwood University
- Luther College
- Lüneburg University
- Lynchburg College
- Messiah College
- Midwestern State University
- Monterey Peninsula College Foundation
- New York University
- Norfolk State University
- North Carolina Agricultural and Technical State University
- Oglethorpe University
- Orange Coast College
- Oxford College of Emory University
- Pepperdine University
- Rhodes College
- Saint Anselm College
- Saint Bonaventure University
- Saint Mary’s College of California
- Saint Michael’s College
- Samford University
- Seton Hall University
- Shimer College
- St. John's College (Annapolis/Santa Fe)
- St. Olaf College
- St. Thomas University (New Brunswick)
- Stockton University
- Stonehill College
- Sun Yat-sen University—Boya College
- Universidad Francisco Marroquin
- The College of New Jersey
- Tulane University
- University of Chicago
- University of Dallas
- University of King's College
- University of Nebraska–Lincoln
- University of Notre Dame — Program of Liberal Studies & First Year Studies
- University of Virginia at Wise
- Valparaiso University
- Vancouver Island University
- Villanova University
- Yale University
