= Jesuitenmission =

Mission arm of the Jesuits in Germany

Coordinates: 49°26′55.26″N 11°4′47.43″E

- Location: Königstraße 64, Nuremberg
- Region: Worldwide
- Main organ: JesuitenWeltweit
- Affiliations: Jesuit, Catholic
- Budget: € 12,000,000
- Staff: 17
- Website: Jesuitenmission

Jesuitenmission, the mission arm of the Society of Jesus in Germany, directs its assistance to the German Jesuit foreign missions, mainly in India, East Timor, China, and Zimbabwe. Pursuing the service of faith and promotion of justice, its works include combating poverty, refugee assistance, education, health, ecology, human rights and pastoral work, while fostering dialogue between cultures and religions.
